= Kappeln, Rhineland-Palatinate =

Kappeln
- Municipality
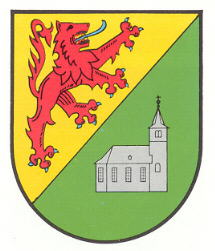
- Coat of arms

- Location of Kappeln within Kusel district
- Interactive map of Kappeln
- Location within Germany Location within Rhineland-Palatinate
- Coordinates: 49°40′33″N 7°34′16″E
- Country: Germany
- State: Rhineland-Palatinate
- District: Kusel
- Municipal assoc.: Lauterecken-Wolfstein

Government
  - Mayor (2019–24): Otfried Buß

Area
  - Total: 7.68 km^{2} (2.97 sq mi)
- Elevation: 230 m (750 ft)

Population (2025-12-31)
  - Total: 205
  - Density: 26.7/km^{2} (69.1/sq mi)
- Time zone: UTC+01:00 (CET)
  - Summer (DST): UTC+02:00 (CEST)
- Postal codes: 67744
- Dialling codes: 06382
- Vehicle registration: KUS
- Website: www.kappeln-pfalz.de

Kappeln (German pronunciation: [ˈkapl̩n]) is an Ortsgemeinde – a municipality belonging to a Verbandsgemeinde, a kind of collective municipality – in the Kusel district in Rhineland-Palatinate, Germany. It belongs to the Verbandsgemeinde Lauterecken-Wolfstein.

== Geography ==
=== Location ===
The municipality lies in the Western Palatinate at the mouth of the Perlebach, where it empties into the Jeckenbach (also called the Merzweiler Bach). Kappeln lies in the lower Perlebach valley at an elevation of some 230 m above sea level. Elevations around the village reach heights of roughly 350 m above sea level. The municipal area measures 767 ha, of which roughly 6 ha is settled and 57 ha is wooded.

=== Neighbouring municipalities ===
Kappeln borders in the north on the municipality of Löllbach, in the east on the municipality of Medard, in the southeast on an exclave belonging to the municipality of Grumbach and the town of Lauterecken, in the south on the municipality of Grumbach, in the southwest on the municipality of Merzweiler, in the west on the municipality of Hoppstädten and in the northwest on the municipality of Schweinschied.

=== Constituent communities ===
Also belonging to Kappeln is the outlying homestead of Udenhof, an Aussiedlerhof (post-war agricultural community), but at one time, a mill.

=== Municipality’s layout ===
Kappeln is an old clump village that has been thrust together, with an older built-up area that spreads over the bottoms of both river valleys, and at the sides up the mountain slopes. The church stands in the middle of the village and the graveyard lies in the west on a road running parallel to the village street on the Perlebach's right bank. Roughly 500 m downstream from the village's lower end and at the side of the road leading to Löllbach stands the Kappelermühle (mill). In the northeast on a hill lies the sporting ground, and in the northwest, about 100 m outside the village, lies a shooting range. On the whole, only very little newer building is to be noted. The former school today serves as the village community centre.

=== Geology ===
Near Kappeln, many fossils from the Permian have been unearthed. Most of them are fish fossils from the great inland sea that spread over the Saar-Nahe Basin about 300,000,000 years ago.

== History ==
=== Antiquity ===
It can be supposed with certainty that the area where Kappeln now lies was already settled in prehistoric times. It is also likely that the modern municipal area hosted a villa rustica in Roman times. Preserved from Gallo-Roman times is a stone relief that has been set into a shed wall at the rectory. It depicts a kneeling man – in some descriptions a “giant” – with snakes for legs, a raised right arm and an outstretched left arm. On his left shoulder he bears a stone with a truncated Latin inscription: FELIC… (“Happy” or “Happiness”). It is believed to have come from a Roman tomb. A Roman cremation grave is to be found not far from the village beneath the Perlekopf (mountain).

=== Middle Ages ===
About the village's beginnings, there can only be speculation. It could be that there was already a small church in what is now today's Kappeln in the Early Middle Ages that stood as a parish seat, and Kappeln may have arisen within this parish. This chapel, which was once the village's namesake (“chapel” in German is Kapelle), has not been preserved. The churchtower's pedestal is supposedly all that is left of it. Probes of two of the pedestal's wooden beams have yielded the building dates 1143 and 1145 (or shortly thereafter). According to a legend, about AD 800, a monk named Udo, who founded Metten Abbey (although history says that while he was the first abbot, his godfather Gamelbert of Michaelsbuch was the actual founder), also built this church. Originally, the village belonged to the Nahegau, and after this was partitioned about 1130, it then passed into the ownership of the Waldgraves of Kyrburg (near Kirn). Later ownership arrangements are not always easy to discern. Kappeln's first documentary mention in 1319 (in which it is called Cappellen) dealt with a dispute between two Waldgravial houses over a claim to a series of villages from the court (judicial district) of Grumbach. According to the document, the magistrates denied Waldgrave Friedrich of Kyrburg any rights to the villages of Schweinschied, Kappeln, Löllbach, Langweiler, Käsweiler (vanished before 1500), Sulzbach, Homberg, Kirrweiler, Oberjeckenbach (cleared out in 1933 by the Nazis to make way for the Baumholder troop drilling ground) and Unterjeckenbach. He could only keep his share of the high jurisdiction and thus the right to carry out executions, because these villages belonged to the Hochgericht auf der Heide (“High Court on the Heath”), at which the Kyrburgs exercised these rights anyway. The limitation of the Waldgrave's claim owed itself to reasons that varied from one village to the next. In Kappeln's case, it had to do with the village's having ended up in several lordships’ hands. Half the village then belonged to the Lords of Löwenstein, while one fourth belonged to the Lords of Greifenclau. The remaining fourth was held by the Counts of Veldenz. The holders of the greatest share, namely the Lords of Löwenstein, also held great might as a result of having been enfeoffed with great parts of the former Nahegau. Castle Löwenstein stands near Niedermoschel. The Veldenzes transferred their share of Kappeln to the Lords Boos von Waldeck, whose seat was at Castle Montfort in a side dale of the lower Nahe. The Rügegerichtsbarkeit (“reprimand jurisdiction”) that the Lords of Löwenstein held, however, they gave to the Waldgraves of Grumbach. This was exercised on a day between 1 October (Saint Remigius’s Day) and 11 November (Saint Martin’s Day). The Waldgraves of Grumbach had to give out the court’s set times by messenger to each house. To pay the judge, they got from each house a Fastnachtshuhn – a Shrovetide chicken. This Rügegericht, as the court itself was called, mainly dealt with simple disputes and property crimes.

=== Modern times ===
In 1589, the Löwensteins acquired the Greifenclaus’ share of Kappeln so that they now owned three fourths of the village. The farmers were then still serfs. In 1596, the Löwensteins sold their majority share to Waldgrave and Rhinegrave Johann of Grumbach. Because the Counts Palatine (Dukes) of Zweibrücken held not only the old Veldenz fourth of Kappeln but also the feudal sovereignty over the village, this sale, which was seen as overstepping authority, led to disputes. Only in 1684 was the dispute banished when, under King Karl XI of Sweden, who also now held the title of Duke of Zweibrücken, Waldgrave and Rhinegrave Leopold Philipp Wilhelm of Grumbach was enfeoffed with Kappeln. Nevertheless, further disputes broke out in the time that followed. In 1780 it was suggested that Kappeln should be exchanged for Nieder-Hundsbach (since vanished). Even as late as 1790, shortly before the French Revolutionary troops marched in, the Rhinegraves were still trying to buy the rights up from the Lords Boos von Waldeck. During the Thirty Years' War (1618-1648), Kappeln, too, suffered much. The village then stretched only from the church downstream to the mill. Particularly in 1635 and 1636, there were assaults by Croatian troops, who were on the Emperor's side, and also by General Gallas, likewise an Imperial ally. The villagers fled their homes and sought shelter in the nearby woods and looked on helplessly as their village was utterly destroyed. Only the old chapel and the shepherd's house were left standing. Hunger and the Plague decimated the population. Many people moved to areas in which the war's ravages were less harsh. Of all those who left, only four came back to Kappeln after the war. Newcomers, however, settled in the village and bolstered the population quite quickly. The village, however, did not quite stand at exactly the same spot as it had before, but rather on the Perlbach upstream from the church. French King Louis XIV's wars of conquest brought Kappeln further losses. On the other hand, the 18th century was relatively quiet. The population grew further, and there were even the first instances of emigration. In 1708, Waldgrave Leopold Philipp Wilhelm bestowed townsman's rights upon his subjects and abolished all compulsory labour, whereas the Boos von Waldeck subjects remained serfs. In 1749, Kappeln was stricken by a heavy storm. There was a high flood, and the whole harvest was destroyed. While all the people managed to save themselves, there were heavy losses among their livestock. In 1789, the chapel, which had fallen into great disrepair, was replaced with a new building, although the tower was retained.

==== Recent times ====
During the time of the French Revolution and the Napoleonic era that followed, the German lands on the Rhine’s left bank were annexed by France. Kappeln belonged to the Mairie (“Mayoralty”) of Grumbach, the Canton of Grumbach, the Arrondissement of Birkenfeld and the Department of Sarre. As early as 1793, French Revolutionary troops advanced through the Glan valley and stationed themselves in some of the villages around Grumbach, including Kappeln. This led to assaults by the soldiers against the villagers. In 1798, the inhabitants of Kappeln became free French citizens. French rule ended in 1814. In 1816, under the terms of the Congress of Vienna, Kappeln passed to the Principality of Lichtenberg, a newly created exclave of the Duchy of Saxe-Coburg-Saalfeld, which as of 1826 became the Duchy of Saxe-Coburg and Gotha. As part of this state, it passed in 1834 by sale to the Kingdom of Prussia, which made this area into the Sankt Wendel district, within which Kappeln lay in the Amt of Grumbach. Later, after the First World War, the Treaty of Versailles stipulated, among other things, that 26 of the Sankt Wendel district's 94 municipalities had to be ceded to the British- and French-occupied Saar. The remaining 68 municipalities then bore the designation “Restkreis St. Wendel-Baumholder”, with the first syllable of Restkreis having the same meaning as in English, in the sense of “left over”. Kappeln belonged to this district until 1937, when it was transferred to the Birkenfeld district, which was actually made up of the Restkreis and a former Oldenburg district, also called Birkenfeld. This new, greater Birkenfeld district lay within the Prussian Regierungsbezirk of Koblenz. After the Second World War, Kappeln at first remained with the Regierungsbezirk of Koblenz, but now in the then newly founded state of Rhineland-Palatinate. In the course of administrative restructuring in the state in 1968, the Amt of Grumbach was dissolved, and in 1972, Kappeln was grouped into the then newly formed Verbandsgemeinde of Lauterecken, and at the same time into the then likewise newly founded Regierungsbezirk of Rheinhessen-Pfalz. In the First World War, nineteen men from Kappeln fell. In the Second World War, 23 fell.

=== Population development ===
The following table shows population development over the centuries for Kappeln:

Year	~1620	1648	1815	1860	1900	1925	1958	1978	2010
Total	200	4	236	314	318	334	318	269	234

=== Municipality’s name ===
In a copy of a 1319 document, the village is described as Cappeln, and in one from 1363 as Capellen. In 1417, the form Udin Capellen cropped up. Other names that the village has borne over time are Vdencapelln by Grunbach gelegen (1457), Vden capell (1562) and Udencapeln (1830 on a general staff map). It is highly likely that the name goes back to a little church at which the village arose (it does, after all, resemble the Modern High German word Kapelle, meaning “chapel”). The other name element prefixed onto several examples above has been interpreted more than one way. Seemingly far-fetched is the story about the monk Utho (or Utto, or Udo), who was the first abbot at Metten Abbey in Lower Bavaria, founding a small church here or even a monastery. Since this element first cropped up only in the 15th century, researcher Otto Karsch assumes that it could have been only then that some kind of relationship with Metten Abbey had arisen, and that the village then named itself after The Right Reverend Utho. Karsch also mentions the name form Zuo der Cappeln (“At the Chapel”), in use before 1400, and also says that the tag Uden— was found in several placenames and could be traced to the then customary (and still quite common in Germany) man's name Utho or Udo. Despite his musings about the link with the monastery in Bavaria, however, it is still unexplained just who this Udo might have been. The likelier version is the one put forth by researchers Dolch and Greule, which holds that this name element relates to the long vanished village of Udenhof. Whatever the truth is, the form of the village's name with the Uden— prefix was still customary up until the earlier half of the 19th century. Since then, though, the form Kappeln has been the only current one.

=== Vanished villages ===
Downstream from today's village of Kappeln, near the Kapellermühle (mill), once stood, supposedly, a place called “Udenhof”. However, nothing beyond that is known about this village.

== Religion ==
Udo's legendary founding of the local church has already been mentioned. Long before the Reformation, Kappeln was already a parish seat in its own right, perhaps with several affiliated villages, which cannot now be identified with any certainty. The village church's beginnings are shrouded in the darkness of time. Of the old Romanesque church hardly anything is left. The oldest parts of the current church are the tower's lower floors, which themselves were built only in the Baroque era. The tower's upper floor comes from 1820. The nave is a Classicist-looking aisleless space with rectangular windows, built in 1789. Unlike almost all villages of the former Amt of Grumbach, Kappeln did not belong to the parish of Sulzbach, but rather to the Church of Meisenheim, which can be explained by noting that the Counts Palatine (Dukes) of Zweibrücken were the village's feudal lords and that the Lords Boos von Waldeck, as Zweibrücken vassals, had a one-fourth share of the village at their disposal. Whereas the Waldgraves of Grumbach generally introduced the Reformation into their domain only in 1556, the new beliefs found their way into Kappeln as early as 1537, by way of Meisenheim. That originally led to disagreements with the Rhinegraves. After they, too, came round to the Reformation, they demanded, as the local lords, to be allowed to confirm the pastor, who consequently would have to give a trial sermon in Grumbach. The pastors in Kappeln found themselves at odds with this. Only in 1618 did the Dukes of Zweibrücken and the Rhinegraves of Grumbach come to an accommodation with the Lords Boos von Waldeck about ecclesiastical organization, thus overcoming the problem. Nevertheless, the arrangements made at that time, after which both the Rhinegraves and the Counts Palatine raised claims to the church in Kappeln, led to conflicts later. When the village of Kappeln passed to the Saxe-Coburg Principality of Lichtenberg in the 19th century, the church community remained organizationally with the church community of Meisenheim. This arrangement was kept in 1834 under Prussian rule and did not change until 1973, when it was united with the one in Grumbach. This newer arrangement has lasted to this day. The former rectory has had a wing built onto it with a meeting room and a kitchen. It is today used by the Sankt Wendel church district as an Evangelical training centre.

== Politics ==
=== Municipal council ===
The council is made up of 6 council members, who were elected by majority vote at the municipal election held on 7 June 2009, and the honorary mayor as chairman.

=== Mayor ===
Kappeln's mayor is Otfried Buß, and his deputies are Michael Welschbach and Heinz Scheib.

=== Coat of arms ===
The municipality's arms might be described thus: Per bend sinister Or a lion rampant sinister gules armed and langued azure and vert a chapel sinister argent.

The charge on the dexter (armsbearer's right, viewer's left) side is the lion once borne as an heraldic device by the Waldgraves and Rhinegraves, the village's historical lords. The chapel on the sinister (armsbearer's left, viewer's right) side is a canting charge for the name “Kappeln” (“chapel” is Kapelle in German); it is based on the village's church.

The arms have been borne since 20 July 1964 when they were approved by the Rhineland-Palatinate Ministry of the Interior.

== Culture and sightseeing ==
=== Buildings ===
The following are listed buildings or sites in Rhineland-Palatinate’s Directory of Cultural Monuments:

- Evangelical church, Hauptstraße 22 (monumental zone) – whole complex made up of the Evangelical church (Romanesque belltower, dendrochronologically dated to the mid 12th century, made taller in 1862; Baroque aisleless church, 1789/1790; Oberlinger organ, 19th century) and three-sided estate (Hauptstraße 20, with mediaeval spolia in the commercial buildings)
- Near Damm 4 – well hut, small quarrystone building, possibly from the 19th century
- Friedhofweg 2 – former rectory; sandstone-framed plastered building on high stone-block pedestal, 1854–1856, architect District Building Councillor Leonhard, Sankt Wendel; in the barn Roman spolia
- Near Oberdorf 15 – well hut, small half-round building, possibly from the 19th century
- Oberdorf 15 – house with crow-stepped gable, marked 1764, conversion in 1908
- At Unterdorf 6 – round-arched portal, marked 1589

=== Regular events ===
Kappeln's kermis (church consecration festival) is held on the first weekend in July. Old customs such as were once kept in all villages in the Glan area are hardly observed anymore.

=== Clubs ===
There have been a men's singing club in Kappeln since 1879 and a gymnastic and sport club with football and shooting sport departments since 1928. Since 1976, there has been an alliance with the neighbouring sport club, Eintracht Hoppstädten called SG Perlbachtal, to be able to play at the Verbandsgemeinde level. The volunteer fire brigade has existed since 1970. Other clubs in the village are the countrywomen's club, the promotional and cultural club and the sport promotional club.

== Economy and infrastructure ==
=== Economic structure ===
In the time after the Second World War, the number of farms in Kappeln greatly shrank, though the amount of farmland remained fairly steady. Thus, the few farms that were left became bigger. Most farms run as primary income earners became secondary sources of income to those who ran them, thus reducing the number of operations to a minimum. Members of the workforce therefore had to seek their livelihoods in ever greater numbers elsewhere. Since that time, the number of commuters has grown considerably. Kappeln has roughly 230 inhabitants, and in the village's 50 or so households, most of those who work do so in the surrounding area, some farther afield than others. Since 1956, there has been a Raiffeisen cooperative in the village.

=== Education ===
As in the other villages in the Amt of Grumbach, in Kappeln in the late 16th century, owing to changes wrought by the Reformation, efforts arose to teach children to read and write. Nevertheless, it was roughly a century before there was actually schooling in Kappeln, and then only in a herdsman's house, not a purpose-built schoolhouse. The schoolteacher then was named Molter. A proper schoolhouse, which still stands today, was not built until 1883 – yet another century later. Exactly one more century thereafter, in 1983, this school was closed. Until 2010, the primary school pupils attended classes at the Grumbach-Hoppstädten primary school, but since, they have been attending the primary school in Lauterecken. The Hauptschule students began attending the Hauptschule in Lauterecken straight after the Kappeln schoolhouse was closed and have been attending it ever since. Lauterecken, which lies only a few kilometres away, also has a Gymnasium. After extensive remodelling work, the schoolhouse now serves as a village community centre with seating room for 300 visitors.

=== Transport ===
Kappeln lies on Landesstraße 373 which, coming from Langweiler links Bundesstraße 270 to the south with Bundesstraße 420 near Meisenheim. Grumbach, 3 km away, can be reached from Kappeln on Kreisstraße 65. Lauterecken, meanwhile, lies some 6 km away. To reach the nearest Autobahn interchanges, near Kusel and Kaiserslautern, one must drive 35 to 45 km. Serving Lauterecken is a railway station on the Lautertalbahn.
