= Merzweiler =

- Municipality
- Coat of arms

- Location of Merzweiler within Kusel district
- Interactive map of Merzweiler
- Location within Germany Location within Rhineland-Palatinate
- Coordinates: 49°39′59″N 7°32′23″E
- Country: Germany
- State: Rhineland-Palatinate
- District: Kusel
- Municipal assoc.: Lauterecken-Wolfstein

Government
  - Mayor (2019–24): Klaudia Schneider

Area
  - Total: 2.27 km^{2} (0.88 sq mi)
- Elevation: 260 m (850 ft)

Population (2025-12-31)
  - Total: 163
  - Density: 71.8/km^{2} (186/sq mi)
- Time zone: UTC+01:00 (CET)
  - Summer (DST): UTC+02:00 (CEST)
- Postal codes: 67746
- Dialling codes: 06788
- Vehicle registration: KUS
- Website: www.merzweiler.de

Merzweiler is an Ortsgemeinde – a municipality belonging to a Verbandsgemeinde, a kind of collective municipality – in the Kusel district in Rhineland-Palatinate, Germany. It belongs to the Verbandsgemeinde Lauterecken-Wolfstein.

== Geography ==
=== Location ===
Merzweiler lies in the Jeckenbach valley in the Western Palatinate between the Palatinate Forest and the Hunsrück at elevations ranging from 250 to 260 m above sea level. The elevations around the village reach heights of more than 300 m above sea level (Brecherberg 362 m, Rüllberg 350 m). The municipal area measures 226 ha, of which roughly 2 ha is settled and 27 ha is wooded.

=== Neighbouring municipalities ===
Merzweiler borders in the north on the municipality of Hoppstädten, in the east on the municipality of Kappeln, in the southeast on the municipality of Grumbach, in the southwest on the municipality of Herren-Sulzbach and in the west on the municipality of Langweiler. Merzweiler also meets the municipality of Homberg at a single point in the southwest.

=== Municipality’s layout ===
Merzweiler lies at a crossroads of one road running east–west from Kappeln to Langweiler, and another running north–south from Hoppstädten to Grumbach. The village community centre stands in the middle of the village where the road to Hoppstädten branches off. In the past, the village won prizes on various occasions in the contest Unser Dorf soll schöner werden (“Our village should become lovelier”). Among the old farmhouses, the Einfirsthaus (“house with a single roof ridge”) is predominant. The small graveyard lies in the village's south end on the road leading to Grumbach.

== History ==
=== Antiquity ===
It is certain that the Merzweiler area was settled in prehistoric times. In Roman times, a villa rustica stood where the village is now, and according to old literary citations, as early as 1756, the remnants of a round Roman temple with mighty stone blocks were unearthed, a complex with a diameter of some “200 paces”. The digs yielded some valuable statues, among them a “Hercules with the club”. One statue had an inscription on its base reading Merkurius. The excavation site can still be picked out today in the cadastral area called “Auf Burg”. About the unearthed sculpture's whereabouts today, though, nothing is known.

=== Middle Ages ===
It is likely that the Frankish farm that became the seed that grew into Merzweiler arose sometime between 800 and 1000. Originally, from 960 to 1140, the village lay in the Nahegau, ruled by the Emichones, but was not mentioned in the documents according to which various villages of the Heidegericht (“Heath Court”) were pledged by the Waldgraves to either the Counts of Veldenz or the Dukes of Zweibrücken. The village likely passed as early as the 12th century to the County of Veldenz when this was founded by Count Gerlach I. Nevertheless, the village's name did not appear among those listed in the 1387 “brotherly partition” between Counts Friedrich and Heinrich of Veldenz either. However, that document does say, in archaic German, that Count Friedrich was to receive “die dorffer und armelude zu Meisenheim, die bisher in das Ampt zu Meisenheim gehörig sind” (“the villages and poor people at Meisenheim, which hitherto have belonged in the Amt at Meisenheim”). Merzweiler must have been among these villages. Even before 1426, the Counts of Veldenz had granted the court at Merzweiler to the House of Boiz von Reipoltskirchen, first to Conrad Boiz, then to Hermann the Elder and last to Hermann the Younger. In 1438, the fief passed to Hermann the Younger's son-in-law, Godelmann Blick von Lichtenberg. As a Veldenz, and later Zweibrücken village, Merzweiler always belonged to the Amt, later Oberamt, of Meisenheim.

=== Modern times ===
Merzweiler was a church seat, possibly right from the Early Middle Ages. This church was enfeoffed with the St. Antoniushof (estate) near Sobernheim. In 1563, the church gave this fief for one hundred years to Guff Hansen. In the Treaty of Meisenheim of 20 March 1595, Count Palatine Johannes I gave Merzweiler to the regents of Rhinegrave Christoph von Grumbach's sons, exchanging it for the villages of Bosenbach and Staufenbach. At the same time, the Count Palatine was granted leave to develop the brine spring near Sankt Julian. The Antoniushof, as an ecclesiastical fief to the Lords of Hansen, was confiscated by the Rhinegraves. In the course of the treaty negotiations, Count Palatine Johannes had a report put together from which one can learn details from the late 16th century about Merzweiler. It says that the Count Palatine was responsible for both high and low Oberkeit (something akin to “superiority”), could have incomes and levies at his disposal, and had hunting rights. It also names all the serfs, 13 families with 44 inhabitants. A serf here belonged, together with his family, to the Count of Palatinate-Veldenz, whose residence was at Lauterecken, but was nevertheless ready to show the Duke of Zweibrücken the customary subservience. At the time of the exchange, it was clearly laid out what taxes and payments Merzweiler's inhabitants had to pay before 1595. The Duke of Zweibrücken received from the Beth (tax) each year 1 Rhenish guilder, 4 Alben and 2 Pfennige. From land taxes he got 19 Rhenish guilders and 4 Batzen. In kind, each household had to deliver to him 11 chickens along with 1 Simmer of fodder oats for each horse, all together 7 Simmer. Even the lowly serf who belonged to the Counts of Palatinate-Veldenz (Lauterecken) had to pay their part in all of this. Out of the wine tithes, one third each had to go to the Count Palatine, the Meisenheim parish priest and Antoni Bos's widow, meaning a rich landholder's family. In an ordinary year, the wine tithe could be as much as 4 or 5 Ohm (an Ohm was usually something between 134 and 174.75 L). Of the grain tithe, yearly 6 to 7 Malter, half corn (wheat or rye) and half oats, one third went to the Meisenheim parish priest while the other two thirds went to the Lords Cratz von Scharfenstein. Payments had to be made to the Church of Merzweiler itself, too, yearly in money 14 Rhenish guilders and 7 Alben, in grain 3 Malter, 2 Simmer 2 Dreiling and 2 Sester of corn and 3 Malter and 1 Simmer of oats. These were received and tallied by the Meisenheim church steward. During the Thirty Years' War (1618–48), Merzweiler was drawn harshly into hardship, particularly in 1635 and 1636 when Croatian troops, who were on the Emperor's side, attacked, as did troops under the likewise Imperial General Matthias Gallas. The villagers fled to the nearby woods and watched as the village's houses were destroyed. Hunger and the Plague decimated the population. Many villagers moved to places that were not quite as harshly affected by the war. When the war ended, a taxation report read “Here it must be said that owing to all kinds of war danger most people have died and owing to dearth have moved out of the land and the taxes and levies are therefore not being raised.” In French King Louis XIV's wars of conquest, there were once more losses. It was relatively calm in the 18th century. The population grew once again, and there was even emigration for the first time. In Merzweiler once lived Johannes Bückler's (1777–1803) grandparents, whose notorious grandson was better known as Schinderhannes. Bückler's grandfather Otto Philipp Bückler was born about 1709 in Hilscheid in the Idar Forest near Thalfang, worked as a headsman and a knacker and died in 1777 in Merzweiler. Bückler's grandmother Maria Magdalena Riemenschneider (1738–1770) came from Merzweiler. Johannes Bückler (1758–1803), Schinderhannes's father, was born in Merzweiler.

==== Recent times ====
During the time of the French Revolution and the Napoleonic era that followed, the German lands on the Rhine’s left bank were annexed by France. Merzweiler now belonged to the Mairie (“Mayoralty”) of Grumbach, the Canton of Grumbach, the Arrondissement of Birkenfeld and the Department of Sarre. As early as 1793, French Revolutionary troops advanced through the Glan valley and billeted themselves in the villages in the Grumbach area. There were assaults by Revolutionary troops against the local populace. After the French were driven out in 1814, the Congress of Vienna established a new political order in post-Napoleonic Europe. In 1816, Merzweiler thus passed to the Principality of Lichtenberg, a newly created exclave of the Duchy of Saxe-Coburg-Saalfeld, which as of 1826 became the Duchy of Saxe-Coburg and Gotha. As part of this state, it passed by sale in 1834 to the Kingdom of Prussia, which made this area into the Sankt Wendel district within the Rhine Province. This district was split into several Ämter; Merzweiler belonged to the Amt of Grumbach. Later, after the First World War, the Treaty of Versailles stipulated, among other things, that 26 of the Sankt Wendel district's 94 municipalities had to be ceded to the British- and French-occupied Saar. The remaining 68 municipalities then bore the designation “Restkreis St. Wendel-Baumholder”, with the first syllable of Restkreis having the same meaning as in English, in the sense of “left over”. Merzweiler belonged to this district until 1937, when it was transferred to the Birkenfeld district, formed out of the Restkreis and a formerly Oldenburg-held district, also called Birkenfeld. This new, bigger Birkenfeld district lay within the Prussian Regierungsbezirk of Koblenz. After the Second World War, the village at first lay within the Regierungsbezirk of Koblenz in the then newly founded state of Rhineland-Palatinate. In 1968, in the course of administrative restructuring, the Amt of Grumbach was dissolved, and Merzweiler was then transferred to the Kusel district, in which it remains today. In 1972, Merzweiler passed to the then newly founded Verbandsgemeinde of Lauterecken, and at the same time from the Regierungsbezirk of Koblenz to the newly founded Regierungsbezirk of Rheinhessen-Pfalz, which has, however, since been dissolved.

=== Population development ===
Until a few decades ago, the greater part of Merzweiler's population earned its livelihood mainly at agriculture. Besides the farmers, there were also farmhands, forestry workers and a few craftsmen. There were hardly any other jobs to be had. Even today, the land within municipal limits is still worked, although few people nowadays work in farming. A good deal of those in the workforce must seek employment elsewhere. As early as 1955, of the 56 active workforce members in Merzweiler, 48 had to commute to jobs.

The following table shows population development over the centuries for Merzweiler:

Year	1595	1815	1860	1900	1925	1958	1997	2007
Total	44	100	130	167	162	208	190	204

=== Municipality’s name ===
In a copy of a document from 1341, Merzweiler is named as Mertzwilr. In 1375 it was called Mortzwiler, and in 1426 Mortzwilre. In 1500, the form Mertzwiler appeared. The village's name, Merzweiler, has the common German placename ending —weiler, which as a standalone word means “hamlet” (originally “homestead”), to which is prefixed a syllable Merz—, believed to have arisen from a personal name, Morizo, suggesting that the village arose from a homestead founded by an early Frankish settler named Morizo. The earlier notion that the village already existed in Roman times with the name Martis Villa (Martis being the genitive of Mars, the war god, and thus this name would have meant “Mars’s Estate”) or Villa Mercis (“Warehouse Estate”) is not nowadays shared by regional historians.

== Religion ==
In Merzweiler, from the Middle Ages onwards, up to the late 16th century, stood a church. Whether the village was originally a self-administering parish is unknown. In the Late Middle Ages, the church was a branch of Medard. Since the village then belonged to the Duchy of Palatinate-Zweibrücken, it was then subject to Zweibrücken ecclesiastical organization. That changed right away when Merzweiler was traded for Bosenbach and Staufenbach in 1595, and thereby ended up with the Rhinegraviate of Grumbach. It was then subject to Rhinegravial ecclesiastical organization. Merzweiler thus belonged first to the parish of Sulzbach, then passing to the parish of Grumbach when this became self-administering in 1808. In Zweibrücken times, the clergyman would hold services during the week at the Merzweiler church, while on Sundays he would hold them at the Kappeln church. About the church building itself little is known. A 1584 ecclesiastical visitation protocol noted that the church had fallen into disrepair and needed to be renovated. Obviously nothing came of this and the church was simply given up. There were never very many Catholics or Jews in Merzweiler in earlier days.

== Politics ==
=== Municipal council ===
The council is made up of 6 council members, who were elected by majority vote at the municipal election held on 7 June 2009, and the honorary mayor as chairman.

=== Mayor ===
Merzweiler's mayor is Klaudia Schneider.

=== Coat of arms ===
The municipality's arms might be described thus: Per bend sinister Or a lion rampant sinister gules armed and langued azure and gules two roses, the smaller surmounting the larger, the larger reversed, both argent and barbed vert and the smaller seeded of the first.

The charge on the dexter (armsbearer's right, viewer's left) side is the lion once borne as an heraldic device by the Waldgraves and Rhinegraves, the area's last feudal rulers. The roses symbolize the village's beauty, bearing witness to which are its showings in various contests. The arms have been borne since 20 July 1964 when they were approved by the Rhineland-Palatinate Ministry of the Interior.

== Culture and sightseeing ==
=== Buildings ===
The following are listed buildings or sites in Rhineland-Palatinate’s Directory of Cultural Monuments:

- Hauptstraße 7 – former mill; building with half-hipped roof, essentially possibly from the latter half of the 16th century, one-floor bakehouse addition

=== Regular events ===
Merzweiler holds its kermis (church consecration festival) on the third weekend in August. Old customs, such as were once observed in all villages of the Glan area, are hardly practised at all nowadays.

=== Clubs ===
The following clubs are active in Merzweiler:

- Gesangverein — singing club
- Landjugendgruppe — country youth group
- Förderverein der Feuerwehr und der Gemeinde — promotional association for the fire brigade and the municipality

== Economy and infrastructure ==
=== Economic structure ===
In the time after the Second World War, the number of agricultural operations in Merzweiler shrank greatly, though the lands used for farming remained mostly preserved. Thus, the farms still in business simply got bigger. Primary income-earning operations mostly shifted to secondary income earners, but all together most of these businesses were reduced to a minimum. Workers therefore had to seek jobs outside the village. As mentioned above, in 1955, of the 56 active workforce members in Merzweiler, 48 had to commute to jobs. The number of commuters has since risen.

=== Education ===
With certainty, schoolchildren from Merzweiler were being taught even before 1595, perhaps in a neighbouring village. From 1595 to 1762, schoolchildren attended the school in Herren-Sulzbach, and thereafter the one in Grumbach. In 1909, the village got its own school. The schoolhouse still stands today, although the school that it housed was dissolved in 1969. The last schoolteacher was Adolf Bender. Until 2010, primary school pupils attended the primary school in Grumbach/Hoppstädten, which has since been closed. The Hauptschule students went straight to the Hauptschule in Lauterecken, and now, the primary school pupils, too, are taught in Lauterecken. The Gymnasium Lauterecken is relatively easy to reach from Merzweiler.

=== Transport ===
Merzweiler lies at a crossroads of Landesstraße 373 (Kappeln—Langweiler), and Kreisstraße 53 (Unterjeckenbach—Grumbach). Kreisstraße 67 towards Hoppstädten also branches off here. Running to the southwest is Bundesstraße 270. Langweiler and Grumbach each lie roughly 2 km away. The nearest Autobahn interchanges at Kusel and Kaiserslautern are quite far away, and can be reached only after driving 35 to 45 km. Serving Lauterecken is a railway station on the Lautertalbahn.
