= Hoppstädten =

- Municipality
- Coat of arms

- Location of Hoppstädten within Kusel district
- Interactive map of Hoppstädten
- Location within Germany Location within Rhineland-Palatinate
- Coordinates: 49°41′30″N 7°32′08″E
- Country: Germany
- State: Rhineland-Palatinate
- District: Kusel
- Municipal assoc.: Lauterecken-Wolfstein

Government
  - Mayor (2019–24): Günter Denzer

Area
  - Total: 6.23 km^{2} (2.41 sq mi)
- Elevation: 310 m (1,020 ft)

Population (2025-12-31)
  - Total: 282
  - Density: 45.3/km^{2} (117/sq mi)
- Time zone: UTC+01:00 (CET)
  - Summer (DST): UTC+02:00 (CEST)
- Postal codes: 67744
- Dialling codes: 06788
- Vehicle registration: KUS
- Website: vg-lauterecken.de

Hoppstädten (German pronunciation: [ˈhɔpʃtɛtn̩]) is an Ortsgemeinde – a municipality belonging to a Verbandsgemeinde, a kind of collective municipality – in the Kusel district in Rhineland-Palatinate, Germany. It belongs to the Verbandsgemeinde Lauterecken-Wolfstein.

== Geography ==
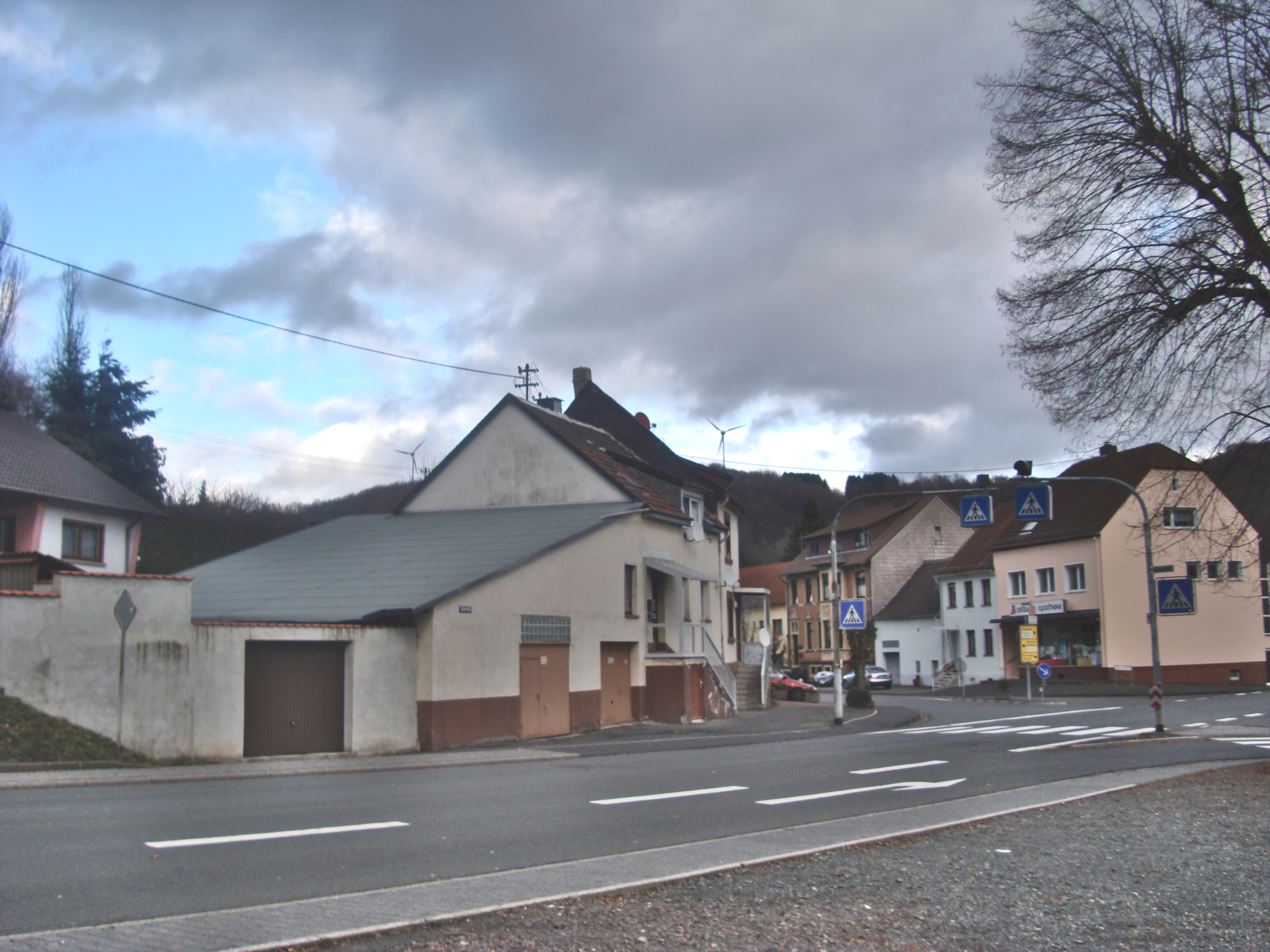
Hoppstädten seen from the train stop

=== Location ===
The municipality lies in the Western Palatinate in the district's northernmost corner, north of Lauterecken. Hoppstädten lies at an elevation of some 300 m above sea level in the headwaters of the Perlebach, which flows first southwards to the Perleberg (mountain), flowing round this and then winding on eastwards, emptying into the Jeckenbach near Kappeln. Elevations around the village reach up to, in the municipal area's northernmost corner, 423 m above sea level near the Welchrötherhof, although that lies outside Hoppstädten's limits within the municipality of Otzweiler in the neighbouring Bad Kreuznach district. Not quite as high are the mountains right near the village and in the municipal area's south (Mannenberg 356 m, Perleberg 377 m). The municipal area measures 624 ha, of which roughly 4 ha is settled and 210 ha is wooded.

=== Neighbouring municipalities ===
Hoppstädten borders in the north on the municipality of Limbach (Bad Kreuznach district), in the northeast on the municipality of Schweinschied (Bad Kreuznach district), in the southeast on the municipality of Kappeln, in the south on the municipality of Merzweiler, in the southwest on the municipality of Langweiler, in the west on the municipality of Sien (Birkenfeld district) and in the northwest on the municipality of Otzweiler (Bad Kreuznach district). Hoppstädten also meets the municipality of Hundsbach at a single point in the north.

=== Municipality’s layout ===
Hoppstädten began as a clump village whose houses and streets were laid out around the church. Expansion in more recent times took place mainly on the through road leading from Sien to Merzweiler and running through the village from north to south. The village thus took on more the shape of a linear village (by some definitions, a “thorpe”). The Perlebach once clove the village into two halves, but this has been hard to see ever since the brook was channelled into an underground pipe in 1859-1860. Outstanding among the older buildings are the church, the former school, the former town hall and, among the older houses, many farmhouses, most of which are no longer used in farming. In 1957, a new schoolhouse was built, and in 1993 a municipal centre. The graveyard lies on a path from the side of the road that leads to Schweinschied. In the municipality's southeast is a broad sport complex with a football pitch, a tennis court, a shooting range, clubhouses and a grilling hut. The former swimming pool in the municipality's north is now in private ownership.

== History ==
=== Antiquity ===
Found in an extensive Celtic grave field in the cadastral area known as the Breinert were remnants of weapons from the Iron Age. The assumption that these graves once lay within a Celtic ringwall has not been confirmed by archaeological research. An old road that runs across the Breinert is traditionally called the Römerstraße (Roman road).

=== Middle Ages ===
Hoppstädten, as its name makes clear, was founded relatively late, although an exact founding date cannot be pinpointed. Hoppstädten originally belonged to the Nahegau, lay within the Hochgericht auf der Heide (“High Court on the Heath”) and was there tightly bound with the lordship of Sien. This lordship was landed, but rather early on, it ended up under the ownership of the Archbishopric of Mainz whose archbishops gave its care over to Vögte, in this case through Saint Alban's Church in Mainz. Records hold proof that in 1108, Archbishop Ruthard bequeathed a Hufe (roughly the same as an oxgang) of the lordship of Sien to the Disibodenberg Monastery when this was newly occupied by Benedictine monks. The Vögte, who were enfeoffed with the lordship of Sien as early as the 11th century, were the Counts of Loon, who themselves had a close kinship with the Counts of Rieneck. It is known for certain that in 1325, Count Dietrich of Loon and Chiny enfeoffed the knight Sir Kindel von Sien “with the Sien House, the tithes themselves, the village of Hobstetten, the tithes at Schweinschied, Selbach (now vanished), Ober-Hachenbach (now vanished), Reidenbach and Wieselbach (now vanished), with the court of the half village and the church rights at Sien.” This was Hoppstädten's first documentary mention, although it is believed that the village likely dates from about 1100. Only a few years later, in 1334, Count Ludwig of Loon and Chiny took this fief back and gave it to the Waldgraves and Rhinegraves, thereby making Hoppstädten a Waldgravial-Rhinegravial fief, although the Archbishops of Mainz remained the overlords. Further feudal grants by the Waldgraves and Rhinegraves kept history very varied for both the House of Sien and, in particular, the village of Hoppstädten. The Waldgraves and Rhinegraves gave half their rights to Hoppstädten to the Electors Palatine in 1368, who in turn granted them to the Counts of Veldenz. Hence, cropping up in a 1388 document is a record of a knight, Sir Heinrich Bube von Ulmen (Nieder-Olm), having received from the Counts of Veldenz an estate in Hostede. A further estate at Hoppstädten was received in 1389 by Wepeling Giesebrecht von Simmern, likewise from the Counts of Veldenz. Relations between Veldenz and Simmern with regard to the village of Hoppstädten were then confirmed in a 1424 document. The Counts of Veldenz transferred one fourth of the tithes from Dhaun and Hoppstädten. Later, this holding passed to the family Braun von der Schmidtburg. When Friedrich von Sien died in 1430, the House of Sien died with him, for he had no male heir, and the Rhinegravial half of the lordship, by way of the late count's daughter Schonette, found its way into others’ hands. Schonette's first husband was Hermann Boos von Waldeck, and her second was Reinhard von Sickingen. When Hermann died about 1439, the lordship of Sien remained in his widow’s hands. After overcoming a few difficulties, Schonette managed to bequeath the inheritance in 1483 to Schwicker von Sickingen, Franz von Sickingen’s father. This only involved half the village, of course; as before, the other half was a Veldenz fief held by the Lords von der Schmidtburg bei Kirn. Thereafter came disputes over the division of rights within the lordship between the Sickingens and the Rhinegraves.

=== Modern times ===
In a 1515 Weistum (a Weistum – cognate with English wisdom – was a legal pronouncement issued by men learned in law in the Middle Ages and early modern times), the reader learns that the lower jurisdiction, at least in a part of Hoppstädten, remained with the Sickingens. The other half passed into the hands of the Waldgraves of Kyrburg. Both lordships, Sickingen and Kyrburg, held only the lower jurisdiction, while the high jurisdiction belonged to the Rhinegraves, who, as before, were responsible for the whole Hochgericht auf der Heide. In 1575 the Lords of Sickingen managed to buy out the Schmidtburgs’ half of the village. After Prince Dominik of Salm-Kyrburg bought up the former Lordship of Sien in 1746, Hoppstädten passed into ownership of the Rhinegraves of Grumbach. Thereafter, the lordly structures remained unchanged until feudalism itself was swept away during the French Revolution. During the Thirty Years' War, the village was destroyed, and the population was wiped out by both the war and sickness.

==== Recent times ====
During the time of the French Revolution and the Napoleonic era that followed, the German lands on the Rhine’s left bank were annexed by France. Within the new arrangement of boundaries, Hoppstädten now found itself in the Mairie (“Mayoralty”) of Sien, the Canton of Grumbach, the Arrondissement of Birkenfeld and the Department of Sarre. After French rule ended, the Congress of Vienna drew new boundaries. The bond between Hoppstädten and the old lordly seat of Sien, which had lasted for hundreds of years, now came to an end. Between the Glan and the Nahe arose the new Principality of Lichtenberg, a newly created exclave of the Duchy of Saxe-Coburg-Saalfeld, which as of 1826 became the Duchy of Saxe-Coburg and Gotha. As part of this state, it passed in 1834 by sale to the Kingdom of Prussia, which made this area into the Sankt Wendel district. Also arising in this region was the Oberamt of Meisenheim in the Principality of Hesse-Homburg, within which lay Hoppstädten. Meanwhile, through a territorial exchange, Sien found itself in the Principality of Lichtenberg. Hesse-Homburg, too, passed to Prussia in 1866 after the last prince died. What had until this time been an Oberamt now became the Meisenheim district within Prussia's Rhine Province; at this time, the Bürgermeisterei (“mayoralty”) responsible for Hoppstädten was at Becherbach. In 1939, during the time of the Third Reich, this district was transferred to the Bad Kreuznach district. During the 19th century, the village experienced various changes, such as the building of a new school in 1840 and of a municipal hall in 1848. In 1859 and 1860, the Perlebach was channelled into a pipe under the village. Woodland clearing brought the village more farmland as early as 1850, which was supposed to improve the supply of land, and thereby food, to the still mainly agricultural populace. Nevertheless, many people left Hoppstädten. In the years 1840 to 1865 alone, twenty families emigrated to the United States. Before the First World War, a typhus epidemic spread across the land. Some people in Hoppstädten came down with the illness, but all of them survived. The Prussian government put forth efforts at this time to curb the causes of these sicknesses by instituting better hygienic conditions. In many places, watermains were built, although in Hoppstädten, the measures went no further than cleaning up the many local wells that supplied the villagers with their water. Nonetheless, a watermain was eventually built in Hoppstädten in 1921, although sewerage laying was not quite finished until rather late, sometime between 1994 and 1998. A swimming pool was built in 1936 and closed in 1968 because the safety and water quality requirements could no longer be met. There were further territorial changes in the wake of the Second World War. Hoppstädten at first still lay in the Bad Kreuznach district within the Regierungsbezirk of Koblenz, and in the then newly founded state of Rhineland-Palatinate. In the course of administrative restructuring in the state in 1968, Hoppstädten was taken from Bad Kreuznach and was reassigned to the Kusel district. In 1972, it passed to the newly founded Verbandsgemeinde of Lauterecken and at the same time to the likewise newly founded Regierungsbezirk of Rheinhessen-Pfalz (Rhineland-Palatinate has since abolished its system of Regierungsbezirke).

=== Jewish history ===
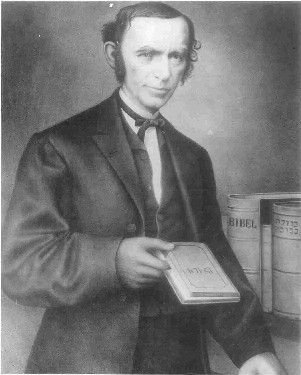
David Einhorn - the Rabbi of Hoppstädten and the State Rabbi (the Landesrabbiner) of the Principality of Birkenfeld from 1842 to 1847

Hoppstädten once had a small Jewish community that was actually an outlying part of the Jewish community in Hundsbach. See the relevant sections of that article for the community's history and information about its synagogue.

=== Population development ===
The village has a rural structure to this day. Until a few decades ago, most of the villagers earned their livelihoods in agriculture. Besides farmers, there were also farmhands, forestry workers and a few craftsmen. Farming now employs very few people. A great number of people in Hoppstädten nowadays need to seek work outside the village. A drop in population figures has occurred in recent years.

The following table shows population development since Napoleonic times for Hoppstädten:

Year	1803	1849	1930	1950	1989	1990	1993	1995	1996	1997	1998	2000	2007	2010
Total	192	451	442	427	391	401	403	400	400	401	407	~400	326	313

=== Municipality’s name ===
In 1325, Hoppstädten had its first documentary mention as Hobstetten in a document from the Rhingravica II assembly by Schott. Other forms of the name that have cropped up, especially in Veldenz documents, are Hoesteden (1388), Hoestede (1389) and Hobesteden (1392). As early as 1408, the form Hobsteden is witnessed, followed soon afterwards by Hoffsteden (1411) and Hoibsteden (1426). The modern form, Hoppstädten, did not first appear until 1820. For a while, to distinguish the village from others with the same name, the form Sien-Hoppstädten was customary. According to researchers Dolch and Greule, among others, the village's name goes back to the Middle High German word hovestat, which simply meant “estate”. Its two syllables correspond with the Modern High German words Hof (“estate” or “farm”) and Stätte (“place” or “stead”). Hence, the village might have arisen from a former lordly estate.

=== Vanished villages ===
The Wiedenhof in the Breinert Forest within Hoppstädten's limits was mentioned in a document as late as 1515, and likely vanished during the Thirty Years' War.

== Religion ==
From the Middle Ages, the parish of Hoppstädten was a branch parish of Sien. Nevertheless, a small church arose in Hoppstädten in the early 16th century, which the worshippers consecrated to Saint Judoc (Jodokus, Jost, Jobst or Josse in German; in this case, the first form was used). Judoc was born in Brittany about 600. He is revered for helping with many illnesses and seeing to rich harvests. He rejected an offer to become Brittany's ruler and, after a pilgrimage to Rome, he lived in a hermitage. A cult grew up around him and spread, in Germany mainly in Lower Bavaria (Landshut) and the Eifel (Walberg near Bonn). In the time of the Reformation, everyone in the village converted to Lutheranism. The mother church then became Hundsbach, then later Kappeln, as of 1800 Hundsbach once again and then in 1921 once more Kappeln. In 1973, Hoppstädten was parochially attached to Grumbach. After the Thirty Years' War, Catholics once again came to settle, although not in great numbers. They remained a minority. Of the roughly 400 inhabitants today, some 300 are Evangelical and some 60 are Catholic. More than 30 inhabitants adhere to other faiths, or profess none at all. The old chapel, Saint Judoc's (Jodokuskapelle) was torn down in the 19th century after having fallen into disrepair. It was replaced in 1886 by a new church. It is a hall church with a wooden ceiling, a quire with ribbed vaulting and a tower with three floors whose roof tapers from an octagon to a high point. The organ comes from 1750 and was built into Saint Judoc's Chapel about 1800, later being moved to the current church.

== Politics ==
=== Municipal council ===
The council is made up of 8 council members, who were elected by majority vote at the municipal election held on 7 June 2009, and the honorary mayor as chairman.

=== Mayor ===
Hoppstädten's mayor is Günter Denzer, and his deputies are Veit Ahlers and Karola Wenderoth.

=== Coat of arms ===
The municipality's arms might be described thus: Per pale Or five bars gules and Or a lion rampant of the second armed and langued azure, in base an escallop of the last.

The bars on the dexter (armsbearer's right, viewer's left) side are drawn from arms once borne by the Lords of Rieneck, who for centuries had holdings in the village. The lion charge on the sinister (armsbearer's left, viewer's right) side was an heraldic charge once borne by the Waldgraves and Rhinegraves, longtime rulers in the area. The scallop shell below the lion is the hermit saint Judoc’s attribute, thus representing the old Hoppstädten church’s patron saint.

The arms have been borne since 1987 when they were approved by the now defunct Rheinhessen-Pfalz Regierungsbezirk administration in Neustadt an der Weinstraße.

== Culture and sightseeing ==
=== Buildings ===
The following are listed buildings or sites in Rhineland-Palatinate’s Directory of Cultural Monuments:

- Evangelical church, Hauptstraße 29: Gothic Revival stone block building, façade tower, 1886/1887
- Near Hauptstraße 31: former town hall; small, sophisticated sandstone-framed plastered building, about 1840

=== Regular events ===
The kermis (church consecration festival) is held on the last weekend in October. Even today, the Straußjugend (“bouquet youth”) keep the old kermis customs. The schoolteacher Adolf Borger compiled extensive works about folklore and customs in Hoppstädten in earlier days, which have been published in the Westricher Heimatblätter.

=== Clubs ===
The following clubs are active in Hoppstädten (the dates represent the time of founding):

- FCK Fanclub “Perlebachdeiwel” Hoppstädten (1998) — 1. FC Kaiserslautern fan club
- Freiwillige Feuerwehr Hoppstädten (1967) — volunteer fire brigade
- Gesangverein Hoppstädten (1892) — singing club
- Schützenverein Perlenkopf Hoppstädten (1957) — shooting sports
- SPD Ortsverein Hoppstädten (1968) — Social Democratic Party of Germany local chapter
- Tennisclub (1979)
- Turn- und Sportverein Eintracht Hoppstädten (1911) — gymnastic and sport club
- Vereinsgemeinschaft Hoppstädten (1993) — association of clubs

== Economy and infrastructure ==
=== Economic structure ===
From yore, the villagers earned their livelihoods mainly at farming, and so it remained until the mid 20th century. There were stone and sand quarries, and brickyards, too. Beginning in 1921, there was also a diamond-cutting shop, alongside all the customary craft occupations. Since then, however, almost all farming operations have been given up, and more and more workers must seek their livelihoods outside the village. Today there is still one inn in the village, but most of the customary craft occupations have vanished. In their stead, new shops have arisen to properly serve the needs in this newer developmental structure.

=== Education ===
From the time before 1800 comes no information about schooling in Hoppstädten. It can be assumed, however, that as early as the 17th century, local people were already striving to establish regular schooling. From old school documents the reader learns that in 1814, the school assistant (that is, teacher) Friedrich Karl Diehlmann was teaching at a schoolhouse in the village, which for that time would by no means have gone without saying. From 1825 to about 1845, a schoolteacher named Vollrath taught. In his time, the school fee that each schoolchild had to pay was raised from 30 to 35 Kreuzer. Under Vollrath's successor Ullrich, wintertime schooling had to be given up because there was not enough firewood to heat the schoolhouse. In 1840, the municipality had a new schoolhouse built, complete with a teacher's dwelling. The old schoolhouse was sold for 150 Rhenish guilders, and was torn down about 1930. Following schoolteacher Ullrich was schoolteacher Ott, whose salary was raised in 1874 from 150 to 250 Thaler. Ott had a family of eleven to support, and he had to teach 100 schoolchildren. In 1893, then schoolteacher Schneider had at his disposal a four-room dwelling with kitchen and cellar as well as a commercial building and plots of land for a small farm. For keeping two swine, 120 ℳ was approved. There was a further salary of 913 ℳ. Outside teaching, Ott earned 8 ℳ as an organist, 36 ℳ as a cantor and 62 ℳ as a municipal scrivener. All together, the income was worth 1,276 ℳ. Beginning in 1933, a second teaching post was instituted, after such a move had been time and again opposed by the municipality (of course, after Adolf Hitler’s seizure of power early in this same year, opposing the authorities became rather riskier). In 1957, the municipality decided to build a new schoolhouse. It was dedicated in 1960. In the course of educational restructuring in 1968, the upper class in Hoppstädten was dissolved, and since then, Hauptschule students have had to be bussed to classes in Lauterecken. Then there were only primary school pupils in Hoppstädten, some from neighbouring villages. In 1970 came the merger with the Grumbach primary school; the resulting institution was called Grundschule Grumbach-Hoppstädten. The school was closed in 2010, and primary school pupils must now likewise attend classes in Lauterecken. Students wishing to attend a Gymnasium may do so in either Lauterecken or Meisenheim.

=== Transport ===
Some 2 km to the west runs Bundesstraße 270. The village of Hoppstädten itself lies on Kreisstraßen 68 and 67. Somewhat less favourable is the access to Autobahnen, with the Kusel interchange roughly 40 km away, and the ones at Kaiserslautern and Wöllstein even farther away (45 and 50 km respectively). Serving Lauterecken is a railway station on the Lautertalbahn.

Distances to important regional centres are as follows:

- Sien — 2 km
- Lauterecken — 11 km
- Meisenheim — 11 km
- Kirn — 20 km
- Idar-Oberstein — 22 km
- Kusel — 30 km
