= Langweiler, Kusel =

Langweiler
- Municipality
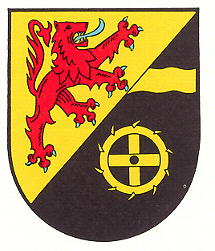
- Coat of arms

- Location of Langweiler within Kusel district
- Interactive map of Langweiler
- Location within Germany Location within Rhineland-Palatinate
- Coordinates: 49°39′56″N 7°31′31″E
- Country: Germany
- State: Rhineland-Palatinate
- District: Kusel
- Municipal assoc.: Lauterecken-Wolfstein

Government
  - Mayor (2019–24): Roland Edinger

Area
  - Total: 4.16 km^{2} (1.61 sq mi)
- Elevation: 288 m (945 ft)

Population (2025-12-31)
  - Total: 204
  - Density: 49.0/km^{2} (127/sq mi)
- Time zone: UTC+01:00 (CET)
  - Summer (DST): UTC+02:00 (CEST)
- Postal codes: 67746
- Dialling codes: 06788
- Vehicle registration: KUS

Langweiler (German pronunciation: [ˈlaŋvaɪlɐ]) is an Ortsgemeinde – a municipality belonging to a Verbandsgemeinde, a kind of collective municipality – in the Kusel district in Rhineland-Palatinate, Germany. It belongs to the Verbandsgemeinde Lauterecken-Wolfstein.

== Geography ==
=== Location ===
The municipality lies on the Jeckenbach in the Western Palatinate between the Palatinate Forest and the Hunsrück. Langweiler lies at an elevation of some 250 to 300 m above sea level east of Bundesstraße 270 and mostly on the Jeckenbach's right bank. Elevations around the village reach heights of almost 400 m to the west and some 370 m to the south and north. The municipal area measures 415 ha, of which roughly 11 ha is settled and 57 ha is wooded.

=== Neighbouring municipalities ===
Langweiler borders in the north on the municipality of Sien, in the northeast on the municipality of Hoppstädten, in the east on the municipality of Merzweiler, in the south on the municipality of Homberg and in the west on the municipality of Unterjeckenbach. Langweiler also meets the municipality of Herren-Sulzbach at a single point in the southeast.

=== Municipality’s layout ===
Langweiler's houses stand mainly along two streets, one running east–west, and the other coming from the south and meeting the east–west street in the village centre. The village's appearance is still widely characterized by Einfirstbauernhäuser (farmhouses with single roof ridges). The graveyard lies in the village's south end on the road that leads to the neighbouring village of Homberg. East of the village, going towards Grumbach and Merzweiler, lies the sporting ground. The two buildings that once housed mills, the Ölmühle (oilmill) and the Tiefenbachermühle, still stand at the side of the road that leads to Unterjeckenbach. In the municipality's south lie two further small settlements east of the Bundesstraße on the Kreisstraße to Homberg. The former schoolhouse today serves as a village community centre.

== History ==
=== Antiquity ===
It can be assumed with certainty that the area around Langweiler was settled in prehistoric times. Neither prehistoric archaeological finds, however, nor even Roman ones, have ever been unearthed here.

=== Middle Ages ===
Theoretically, Langweiler, with a name ending in —weiler, might have been founded as early as the Early Middle Ages by Frankish farmers coming along a Roman road. Likelier, though, is the assumption that it arose much later, perhaps only in the 10th or 11th century, as a hamlet (Weiler in German). The village originally belonged to the Nahegau, and passed together with Grumbach in 1258 into the ownership of Count Godefried, who endowed the Waldgravial line of Dhaun. In connection with this, Langweiler also had its first documentary mention in Waldgrave Konrad's 1276 will, which is preserved in a copy. Langweiler belonged to the Hochgericht auf der Heide (“High Court on the Heath”). Together with other villages in the Grumbach castle domain (Burgbann), the village was pledged in 1363 to Sponheim-Starkenburg. According to a 1415 Veldenz document, Gottfried von Schmidtburg had received from Count Friedrich of Veldenz seven Schilling in Heller in holdings at Langweiler. According to this, the village was in the meantime pledged to the Counts of Veldenz. In 1448, the Rhinegraves sold several villages in the Grumbach area to Count Palatine (or Duke) Stephan, who can be considered the successor to the Counts of Veldenz, who had died out in the male line four years earlier. Among the villages named in this deal was Langweiler, which had already been pledged. In 1477, though, the Waldgraves bought all these villages back, along with Langweiler.

=== Modern times ===
In 1575, the independent Rhinegravial House of Grumbach came into being. Whether Langweiler was further sold or pledged is unknown. Thus the village thereafter belonged to the Grumbach line of the Rhinegraves. There was no change in this lordship until the French Revolution broke out. During the Thirty Years' War, the village was plundered time and again, particularly in 1635 and 1636, when Croatian troops of the Imperial Army came through the area. Langweiler lay on a through road. The Plague, too, claimed many victims, and only a few people survived the war. After the Thirty Years' War ended, the area was still affected by marauding troops. Only slowly could Langweiler recover. With French King Louis XIV's wars of conquest came more suffering.

==== Recent times ====
During the time of the French Revolution and the Napoleonic Era that followed, the German lands on the Rhine’s left bank were annexed by France. Langweiler belonged, during the French administration, to the Mairie (“Mayoralty”) of Grumbach, the Canton of Grumbach, the Arrondissement of Birkenfeld and the Department of Sarre. As early as 1793, French Revolutionary troops advanced up the Glan valley and took quarter in the villages near Grumbach, including Langweiler. There were assaults by the soldiers against the local people. In 1816, as a result of the Congress of Vienna, Langweiler passed to the Principality of Lichtenberg, a newly created exclave of the Duchy of Saxe-Coburg-Saalfeld, which as of 1826 became the Duchy of Saxe-Coburg and Gotha. As part of this state, it passed by sale in 1834 to the Kingdom of Prussia, which made this area into the Sankt Wendel district in the Rhine Province. This district was subdivided into several Ämter, with Hausweiler belonging to the Amt of Grumbach. Later, after the First World War, the Treaty of Versailles stipulated, among other things, that 26 of the Sankt Wendel district's 94 municipalities had to be ceded to the British- and French-occupied Saar. The remaining 68 municipalities then bore the designation “Restkreis St. Wendel-Baumholder”, with the first syllable of Restkreis having the same meaning as in English, in the sense of “left over”. Its seat was at Baumholder. Langweiler belonged to this district until 1937, when it was transferred to the Birkenfeld district, until then part of Oldenburg. This lay in the Prussian Regierungsbezirk of Koblenz. After the Second World War, Langweiler at first lay in a Regierungsbezirk of the same name within the then newly founded state of Rhineland-Palatinate. In the course of administrative restructuring in Rhineland-Palatinate, the Amt of Grumbach was dissolved and in 1969, Langweiler was transferred, this time to the Kusel district, in which it remains today. In 1972, it was transferred to the then newly founded Verbandsgemeinde of Lauterecken, and at the same time from the Regierungsbezirk of Koblenz to the then newly founded (but since dissolved) Regierungsbezirk of Rheinhessen-Pfalz. On 13 October 1939, a British combat aircraft crashed near Langweiler. The pilot survived and the locals took him to the hospital. Thirty years later, Gp Capt Day came back to revisit the site of his crash and rescue.

=== Population development ===
The village of Langweiler has remained rurally structured to this day. The greater part of the population worked until not many years ago at agriculture. Besides farmers, there were also farmhands and forestry workers, and also a few craftsmen. Agriculture nowadays employs only a few people, and not even one farm in the municipality is today run as a primary source of income. Many people now seek work outside the village.

The following table shows population development over the centuries for Langweiler:

Year	1815	1860	1900	1925	1958	2000	2007
Total	197	281	328	322	301	303	265

=== Municipality’s name ===
In the later copy of the 1276 document, the village is named as Langvilre. Other forms of the name that have cropped up in centuries-old documents are as follows: Landevilre (1319, in an original document), Landweiler (1448) and Langweiller bey Grumbach (1598). The village's name, Langweiler, has the common German placename ending —weiler, which as a standalone word means “hamlet” (originally “homestead”), to which is prefixed a syllable Lang—, believed by researchers Dolch and Greule to have arisen from a personal name, Lando, suggesting that an early Frankish settler named Lando founded the village. The —weiler ending itself, though, does not suggest any particular founding date. The 16th-century change of name was also a change of meaning, for lang means “long” in German.

=== Vanished villages ===
In the area of Langweiler's and Homberg's current municipal areas once lay a village named Käsweiler, whose location is, however, no longer known with any certainty. It is generally considered to be part of Homberg today, and is treated in more detail in the corresponding section of the article about that municipality.

== Religion ==
Langweiler may well have belonged from the Early Middle Ages to the parish of Herren-Sulzbach. The village has never had its own church. Thus, its ecclesiastical history is tightly bound with Herren-Sulzbach’s. Beginning in the late 13th century, the Order of Saint John began to gather influence. Into the Waldgravial-Rhinegravial House of Grumbach, the Reformation was introduced in 1556 and the Protestant parish of Herren-Sulzbach was founded, to which Langweiler then also belonged. Until the Thirty Years' War, all the villagers were Protestant. Later, however, the feudal lords had to tolerate other faiths, although the newer ones never earned any special significance. Even today, the predominant denomination is the Evangelical Church.

== Politics ==
=== Municipal council ===
The council is made up of 6 council members, who were elected by majority vote at the municipal election held on 7 June 2009, and the honorary mayor as chairman.

=== Mayor ===
Langweiler’s mayor is Roland Edinger.

=== Coat of arms ===
The municipality’s arms might be described thus: Per bend sinister Or a lion rampant sinister gules armed and langued azure and sable a fess enhanced wavy below which a waterwheel spoked of four, both of the first.

The red lion charge on the dexter (armsbearer’s right, viewer’s left) side refers to the arms once borne by the Waldgraves, once the feudal landholders in Langweiler. The wavy fess on the sinister (armsbearer’s left, viewer’s right) side represents the brook that flows through the village while the remaining charge, the waterwheel, also on the sinister side, stands for the several mills that once stood in the municipality.

== Culture and sightseeing ==
=== Buildings ===
The following are listed buildings or sites in Rhineland-Palatinate’s Directory of Cultural Monuments:

- Oberdorf (“Upper Village”), at the graveyard – warriors’ memorial 1914-1918 by L. Devauze, Lauterecken, expanded after 1945

=== Regular events ===
Langweiler holds its kermis (church consecration festival) on the second weekend in October. Particularly old customs, such as were once observed in all villages in the Glan area, are hardly practised anymore.

=== Clubs ===
The following clubs are active in Langweiler:

- Gesangverein 1877 — singing club
- Sportverein Langweiler-Merzweiler 1947 — sport club
- SPD-Ortsverein Jeckenbachtal 1983 — Social Democratic Party of Germany local chapter

The yeardates are parts of the clubs’ names and indicate the time of founding.

== Economy and infrastructure ==
=== Economic structure ===
There were once four mills in Langweiler. Two of them were oilmills, one was a gristmill and the fourth was a powder mill. The workers at each of these were usually only the owner and his family. The mills have long since been given up, but their locations are still known. Today the village has a major building company that even employs workers from outside the village. Otherwise, workers usually have to seek work elsewhere. As early as 1960, it was said that of the 80 villagers in the workforce, 50 were commuters. Today it is an even greater proportion.

=== Education ===
As in other villages in the Amt of Grumbach, the effects of the Reformation in Langweiler led to efforts in the late 16th century to teach children to read and write. At first, schoolchildren had to attend classes in neighbouring Herren-Sulzbach, though in the 18th century, a teacher was also hired in Langweiler for winter school (a school geared towards an agricultural community's practical needs, held in the winter, when farm families had a bit more time to spare). In 1806, the municipality established year-round schooling, which was imparted in a private house. In 1857, the schoolhouse was built, at first with only one small classroom and a teacher's dwelling. In 1883, the municipality had a bigger schoolroom built. In 1967, the school association for the whole Amt of Grumbach was founded. The upshot from this was that at first, Hauptschule students had to attend school in Offenbach, while primary school pupils stayed for a few years yet in the village, before they then had to go to the Grundschule Grumbach-Hoppstädten. This lasted until 2010. The last teacher was Christian Büschel. Today, primary school pupils and Hauptschule students attend their respective schools in Lauterecken. The nearest higher school is the Gymnasium Lauterecken.

=== Transport ===
An advantage to Langweiler's economic development is the rather favourable location with regard to transport, lying as the village does on the linking road from the Glan valley to the Nahe valley. Langweiler lies on Bundesstraße 270, which runs by the village just to the west. There are further good links to Bundesstraßen 41 and 420. Furthermore, the Bundesstraße in the village is crossed by Landesstraße 373 and Kreisstraße 53. The former Amt seat of Grumbach lies 3 km away. To the town of Lauterecken, now the Verbandsgemeinde seat, it is 6 km. Less favourable are the links to the Autobahnen. These can be reached only at Kusel (roughly 40 km), Kaiserslautern (45 km) and Wöllstein (50 km). Serving Lauterecken is a railway station on the Lautertalbahn.
