= Grumbach =

- Municipality
- Coat of arms

- Location of Grumbach within Kusel district
- Interactive map of Grumbach
- Location within Germany Location within Rhineland-Palatinate
- Coordinates: 49°39′25″N 7°33′22″E
- Country: Germany
- State: Rhineland-Palatinate
- District: Kusel
- Municipal assoc.: Lauterecken-Wolfstein

Government
  - Mayor (2019–24): Markus Christian

Area
  - Total: 3.31 km^{2} (1.28 sq mi)
- Elevation: 240 m (790 ft)

Population (2025-12-31)
  - Total: 480
  - Density: 150/km^{2} (380/sq mi)
- Time zone: UTC+01:00 (CET)
  - Summer (DST): UTC+02:00 (CEST)
- Postal codes: 67745
- Dialling codes: 06382
- Vehicle registration: KUS
- Website: www.grumbach-glan.de

Grumbach is an Ortsgemeinde – a municipality belonging to a Verbandsgemeinde, a kind of collective municipality – in the Kusel district in Rhineland-Palatinate, Germany. It belongs to the Verbandsgemeinde of Lauterecken-Wolfstein.

== Geography ==
=== Location ===
The municipality lies in the Western Palatinate on the river Glan’s left bank, roughly 2 km up the Schwinzbach, which empties into the Glan at the biggest valley cut on the reach of the Glan between Niederalben and Meisenheim. Here, the valley broadens out, and the mountain spur being formed by the mouth of the Hundsgraben affords the site some solid ground. The settled centre is found exclusively on the south slope at an elevation of 235 m above sea level. The valley is bordered in the south by the 354 m-high so-called Hellenwald (forest) and in the north by the 338 m-high Roman road. The outlying centre of Windhof, lying 3 km to the northeast an elevation of 340 m above sea level offers the visitor an outstanding panorama of the surrounding countryside, owing to its exposed location. The municipal area measures 331 ha, of which 48 ha is wooded.

=== Neighbouring municipalities ===
Grumbach borders in the north on the municipality of Kappeln, in the east on the town of Lauterecken, in the south on the municipality of Hausweiler, in the west on the municipality of Herren-Sulzbach and in the northwest on the municipality of Merzweiler. Grumbach also meets the municipality of Buborn at a single point in the southwest, and has an exclave to the northeast that borders in the northeast on the municipality of Medard, in the southeast and southwest on the town of Lauterecken and in the northwest on the municipality of Kappeln.

=== Constituent communities ===
Also belonging to Grumbach is the outlying homestead of Windhof.

=== Layout of the Municipality ===
The mountain spur formed by the meeting of two valley cuts, and the resulting crags that stand here have made it possible to build a settlement here. Examinations of the still preserved stonework at the castle point to Salian times (1024–1125), but without better, more verifiable sources, this remains unclear. Nor is it at all clear, for lack of any proof, that the lore handed down in the village itself about the village’s founding has any truth to it; this would have the listener believe that Grumbach was founded by the Knights Templar. What is clear, though, is that in the 13th century, there was indeed a castle upon the heights of the mountain spur. The word castrum used in the document in question attests to such a complex in what was then the legal sense. This first documentary mention and the continuous accounts thereafter, based on solid sources, lead to the conclusion that the village’s founding came about in the earlier half of the 13th century, which would also match what is classically believed to be the castle’s building date: 1200–1250. The said continuous habitation, however, is in no way to be disregarded. How this complex or possible forerunner building might have looked is utterly unknown, as is the area over which it held sway. Arising during the course of the castle’s building was a settlement in the dale, which had its beginnings in what is now Unterstraße (“Lower Street”). Insofar as the street lying higher up – called, of course, Oberstraße – reached up the Middle Ages to the castle or to the settlement lying at its foot, this is something that cannot be determined today, although there is mention of Burgmannen’s houses “within and without” (ußen und innen in archaic German), and it is to be assumed that there would have been fortified structures at least at the way into this street. Despite having been granted town rights, the village remained wedged in between these two streets, and a town wall was never built. The way that the village has today quite contrarily spread out to the west was ensured by the Hundsgraben, which despite the ending —graben (“ditch”) is a natural waterway. This now stretches to the street “In der Hohl” and along its extension. The village’s east side was protected merely by manmade ditches, palisades and hedges. Several gates were mentioned, such as the gates in the dale that were mentioned in 1590. These had to be maintained by the citizenry. The gates might have stood at the beginnings of each of the two streets mentioned above. To this day, the western end of Unterstraße is still customarily called “Untertor” (“Lower Gate”). Worth mentioning is the hierarchical division of building practices, which reflected the feudal societal structure: On the heights stood the old castle, which represented the way the nobility lived. Below lay Oberstraße with its impressive residential buildings, which set themselves apart by the size of their plots. Farther below lay Unterstraße, in the bottom of the dale. Here lived “the little people” with correspondingly little plots for their little houses. While the settlement down below in the dale kept its shape over several centuries, the castle underwent several changes, which themselves fundamentally altered Grumbach’s appearance. Quite likely the most far-reaching change came in the course of the end of the whole concept of the castle, in the latter half of the 16th century, when it was chosen to be a noble residence. If the ruling family was to live there permanently, the mediaeval castle would have to be adapted to more modern requirements, which would end up fully overhauling very nearly all aspects of the then existing building. In other words, the castle was converted from a Burg – the customary German word for a castle used as a military fortification – into a Schloss – the word used for a palace or a palatial castle. This semantic distinction was one that had arisen in German only over the two foregoing centuries. The terracelike, well aligned building work done in the areas known as “Auf dem Schloss” (“At the Palatial Castle”) and “Im Lustgarten” (“In the Pleasure Garden”) still bear witness today to the way that architectural imagination strove for harmony, here in a V-shaped convergence of the two at a newly built residence. Parallels can be drawn with the Hortus Palatinus at Heidelberg Castle. Only relatively late, in the latter half of the 18th century, did the settlement in the dale, this time in the course of an economic upswing, begin to spread out to the west and east, giving rise to representative residential buildings, some of which can still be recognized today. However, as also in all later expansions, these ones might not have left Grumbach with its old character, that of a late mediaeval-early modern castle-market town that presented itself in a well-nigh unique way within the district of Kusel. One thing that also characterized the building in Grumbach may have been the French Revolution and its consequences, which destroyed feudalism, as symbolized by the Schloss. Peripheral buildings, though, among others the last lordly building project, the reconstruction of a Schloss building that was never finished (Sonnhofweg 17), and the archive building, still remain. The result of these events is not least the church, which now stands on the spot once occupied by the Schloss, and now crowns the village in much the same way as the former building complex once did. In the 19th century, too, Grumbach spread only along the paths already mentioned, filling in gaps in the built-up area, and pushing the edges outwards. Perhaps the foremost building project was the Amt courthouse (Amtsgerichtsgebäude) in 1834 and 1879. In 1906, Grumbach had 116 residential buildings. Out in the Ortsteil of Windhof lay six independent farms, and there were three more at the Sonnhof north of the village. In the 1920s, once more gaps in the built-up area were being filled, sometimes with striking buildings, before the Second World War put an end to such work, at least for a while. In 1937, the gymnasium on Gemeinde-Zimmerer-Platz (square), which also fulfilled the function of a village hall, was built by a building bee organized by the gymnastic club. Building activity begun in the 1960s, which mainly involved the area called “Im Grund”, opened up an extensive expansion by the 1970s, one vaster than the village had hitherto known, in the new building zone called “Auf’m Vogelsheerd”. In 2001, there were 185 houses in Grumbach.

== History ==
=== Antiquity ===
Archaeological finds bear witness to human activity in the current municipal area as far back as the Old Stone Age. The presence of a Mithras monument from Roman times is unfortunately only known from literature and may somehow be linked with the Roman road that once passed by the village to the north. More recent examinations of aerial photographs have shown that there might have been a settlement in Roman times in the area of the Schlossberg, west of the current village of Grumbach. However, verification of this assumption awaits archaeological examination, but until that is done, a definitive pronouncement as to the village’s beginnings cannot be made.

=== Middle Ages ===
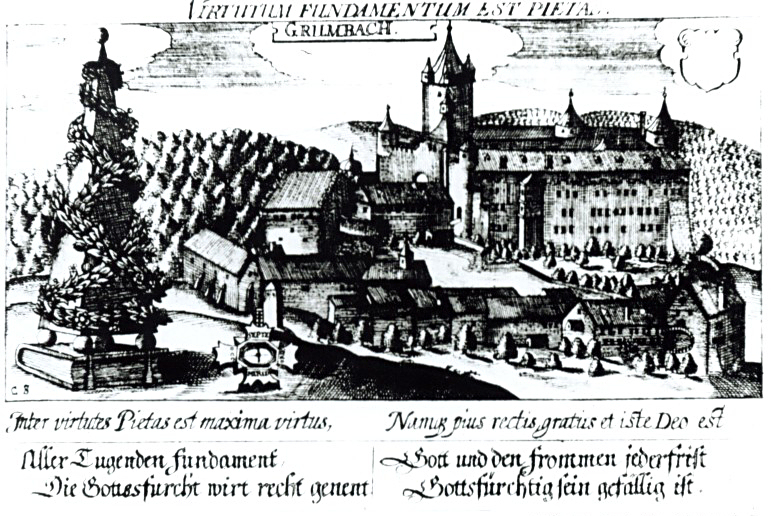
Grumbach 1627

In March 1243, Grumbach had its first documentary mention, when the then holder of the castle, Waldgrave Conrad II of Kyrburg, enfeoffed the Duke of Brabant with it. The occasion was a dispute that the Waldgrave was waging with the Archbishop of Mainz. The castle is said to have been one of the ancestral seats of the Waldgravial family that in literature could be traced back to the Emichones, the counts in the Nahegau. They were in ownership of the Waldgraviate, which had as its hub the area around Kirn on the river Nahe. In 1258, while he was still alive, Waldgrave Conrad divided his holdings up among his sons, whereby his son Gottfried was given the castles of Dhaun and Grumbach. Until the late 16th century, Grumbach was supposedly tightly bound with Castle Dhaun’s fate, with both always remaining together in subsequent divisions of inheritance. The ruling count of this sideline resided at Castle Dhaun, with Grumbach being occupied and administered by Burgmannen in this time. Grumbach was sacrificed as a pledged holding in the then pervasive and customary monetary politics, first to the Counts of Sponheim from 1363 to 1444 (Upper Sponheim from 1437-1444), and then to the Counts Palatine of Zweibrücken from 1444 to 1477. In 1350, Rhinegrave Johann II joined the Waldgraviate’s inheritance through marriage, and henceforth, the comital family called itself “Waldgraves and Rhinegraves” (Wild- und Rheingrafen in German), later adding to this the title Count of Salm in 1475. On 29 July 1330, the village was granted town rights on the Kaiserslautern model in a freedom certificate by Emperor Ludwig the Bavarian, although there were no major attendant effects. The village was still habitually called a Tal (“dale” or “valley”) or Flecken (“market”). From 1385, records show that Grumbach was the seat of an Amt. The holder of rights over Grumbach also presided at the High Court on the Heath (Hochgericht auf der Heide) at Sien, though for a time there was also a Hochgericht auf der Höh’ (“High Court on the Heights”) between Grumbach and Kappeln, whose authority was limited to the then parish of Herren-Sulzbach. In its heyday, the lordship of Grumbach comprised all together more than 70 villages.

=== Modern times ===
Dhaun Waldgravial-Rhinegravial rule ended in 1574 when the brothers split their father’s inheritance and Johann Christoph moved his residence to Grumbach, thereby founding the Rhinegraves at Grumbach, a noble house that lasted until the fall of the Holy Roman Empire. One peculiarity was the village’s Imperial immediacy and Imperial Statehood, which gave Grumbach a seat and a vote at the Imperial Diet (Reichstag), which supposedly likewise lasted until the Empire’s downfall; this was unique among places now within the Kusel district, and was the result of a 1475 Imperial edict raising the Dhaun-Grumbach line to Imperial Counts. In this time, an administrative structure began to form in which Amt and state administration, the latter in the form of the chancellery, each had its seat in Grumbach. This structure was supposedly preserved well beyond feudal times, characterizing the village in increasing measure until in the course of administrative restructuring in Rhineland-Palatinate in 1969-1972 it abruptly met its end.

==== Recent times ====
The lordship’s presence over the village likewise abruptly met its end when French troops came marching in during the upheavals brought about by the French Revolutionary Wars in the 1790s, whereafter Grumbach was de facto a part of France, but this became de jure under international law by the terms of the 1801 Treaty of Lunéville. The Rhinegraves of Grumbach, meanwhile, who had been forced into flight before the Revolutionary tide early in 1793, were richly compensated by the Extraordinary Imperial Deputation at Regensburg in 1802-1803 for the lands on the Rhine’s left bank that they had lost to the French, by being granted, through their delegates’ skilful negotiation, lands in the now secularized Prince-Bishopric of Münster in Westphalia, where their line, as Princes at Salm-Horstmar, Waldgraves and Rhinegraves, still thrives today, if not as rulers. The time of being an independent country was over, not so, however, that of being an administrative centre. In 1798, the Canton of Grumbach was formed, which was grouped into the likewise newly formed Department of Sarre. In 1800, to form a level of government between these two, Arrondissements were formed, and the Canton of Grumbach was grouped into the Arrondissement of Birkenfeld. After the reconquest of the German lands on the Rhine’s left bank, the first authority that held sway here was the jointly Austrian- and Bavarian-led Landesadministrationskommission (“State Administration Commission”), whose seat was at Bad Kreuznach, before 1815, when the Congress of Vienna divided the Canton of Grumbach. The village itself remained with the joint administration, only to pass on 1 July 1816 to the Kingdom of Prussia. Likewise at the Congress of Vienna, it was agreed that other princes who had participated in the Wars of Freedom should get a share of the compensation, and accordingly, there was a wholesale “trade in souls”, which saw Grumbach, among other places, ceded to the Duchy of Saxe-Coburg-Saalfeld, which eventually named its newly created Palatine exclave the Principality of Lichtenberg on 24 February 1819. The Duchy became as of 1826 the Duchy of Saxe-Coburg and Gotha. The exclave’s great distance from the motherland – Saxe-Coburg’s main territory mainly lay over in Saxony far to the east – and, not least of all, the upheavals of 1832 brought about the sale of this economically neglected principality, for a handsome sum in Thalers, back to Prussia, a deal that was completed on 22 September 1834. As part of this state, Grumbach, too, passed to Prussia, which made this area into the Sankt Wendel district, which belonged to the Regierungsbezirk of Trier in Prussia’s Rhine Province. Grumbach persisted as seat of the area first still known as a canton and then later once more as an Amt. Later, after the First World War, the Treaty of Versailles, which went into force on 10 January 1920, stipulated, among other things, that 26 of the Sankt Wendel district’s 94 municipalities had to be ceded to the British- and French-occupied Saar. The remaining 68 municipalities then bore the designation “Restkreis St. Wendel-Baumholder”, with the first syllable of Restkreis having the same meaning as in English, in the sense of “left over”. Grumbach belonged to this district until 1 April 1937, when it was transferred to the Birkenfeld district in the Regierungsbezirk of Koblenz. In the early 1930s, the Nazi Party (NSDAP) was quite popular in Grumbach. In the 1932 Reichstag elections, 50.8% of the local votes went to Adolf Hitler’s party. Hitler’s success in these elections paved the way for his Enabling Act of 1933 (Ermächtigungsgesetz), thus starting the Third Reich in earnest. This did not last, of course, and after the Second World War, Prussia, which all this time had existed first as a kingdom within the German Empire and then after 1918 as a province within Germany, throughout Weimar times and the Third Reich, was dissolved on 25 February 1947, although the new state of Rhineland-Palatinate had already come into being on 30 August 1946. A further change came about in the 1960s on the occasion of administrative restructuring in Rhineland-Palatinate. The whole Amtsbezirk of Grumbach was in 1969 grouped into the Kusel district, in which it remains today. Although there was a Verbandsgemeinde of Grumbach for a short time, this was grouped on 1 January 1972 into the Verbandsgemeinde of Lauterecken, ending Grumbach’s longstanding status as an administrative centre of any kind. The Grumbach Amt court had already been dissolved in 1952 and its jurisdictional area annexed to the Lauterecken Amt court’s area.

=== Population development ===
Concrete data about population for the time of the French Revolution have not survived to the present day. The castle founded in the Middle Ages led as an economic factor to greater settlement in the dale over which it stood. From a 1385 peace agreement it is known that the castle was watched by 13 servants, which for such a complex was a relatively high number. The hostels in the dale that the agreement also mentions and the non-resident lower nobility’s Burgmann politics, known to have characterized the Late Middle Ages, point to an infrastructure that fit the conditions that then prevailed, with the attendant population development. Though Grumbach’s rise to town might not have ensured any growth beyond what is above outlined, serfdom was abolished here only in 1708. Apart from the Plague year 1632, nothing is known about the effects of the Thirty Years' War on Grumbach, but France’s Politique des Réunions hindered any population growth by plunging the area into continual military conflict. Also having influence on migration was taxation by the lordship on property that was to be taken abroad, and then there was the Wildfang dispute waged with the Electorate of the Palatinate, which had resulted from the Counts Palatine’s belief that they were entitled to seize any foreign person in their territory not apparently attached to any lord and force him into serfdom. Only in the latter half of the 18th century did Grumbach show any population growth. This could be traced back to administrative measures that had conferred concrete fiscal advantages on immigrants. The social stratification, which also manifested itself topographically, a layering effect that can still be seen in the village, is detailed above under Municipality’s layout. Grumbach’s continuous status as an administrative centre of one kind or another, even beyond the Holy Roman Empire’s final downfall, ensured that the village always had a solid population core, although emigration did make its mark in the time of pauperism. Locally, this reached its peak in the years 1846-1850, during which 63 people emigrated. The inhabitants in 1928 were divided denominationally into 547 Protestants, 20 Catholics and 9 Jews. The great wave of migration after the Second World War was also felt in Grumbach.

The following table shows population development since Napoleonic times for Grumbach:

Year	1815	1843	1871	1905	1928	1939	1950	1963	1970	2001	2007
Total	376	558	493	584	576	552	641	596	545	615	513

=== Municipality’s name ===
The village’s name, Grumbach, is made up of two elements. The latter one is the common placename ending —bach, meaning “brook” in German. The former one derives from grun, gruon, a form of the Middle High German gruone cropping up mainly in central Germany, a derivative of inchoative character from Old High German gruoni. This stems from the Proto-Indo-European root *ghro-, *ghre-, meaning “sprout” or “grow” (and indeed the English word “grow” springs from the same Proto-Indo-European root). Before a labial consonant, /n/ can only appear in compounds, but in this case, it often shifts to the labial nasal consonant, that is, /m/, although generally only in compounds that are no longer clearly felt to be compounds. By monophthongization, the /u/ was preserved before nasal links such as /mb/ or /nb/, while /o/ arose before /a/ or /e/ in the following syllable. Placenames ending in —bach are a mark of the time of settlement expansion, as this ending was the popular one for new villages in the 8th to 11th centuries. Folk etymology holds a different explanation of the name’s derivation. According to this, the name Grumbach is to be understood as meaning “green brook” (this would be grüner Bach in Modern High German), a name for the stream, for its colour, presumably due to the presence of bits of plant matter, which would be accounted for by mediaeval views of nature. Other forms that the name Grumbach has taken over the ages are Castrum Grunebach (1243), Grunenbach (1258), Grunbach (1265), Grumbach (1353), Gronbach (1393), Grumbech (1399) and Grombach (1514).

As for the outlying centre of Windhof, its name was mentioned in 1387 as Wintberg and in 1751 as WintBergerHof before its current name appeared in 1797.

== Religion ==
Grumbach’s own parish was founded only a few years before the Holy Roman Empire’s final downfall. Before this, Grumbach had belonged to the parish of Herren-Sulzbach, which lay 3 km to the southwest. There stood the community’s mother church as a parish church to the people from the dale, for Grumbach had no church of its own. It was also the ruling family’s burying ground. The Rhinegraves as well as the castle servants attended church services at the castle chapel (Schlosskapelle), which had its first documentary mention in 1584 and was festively reconsecrated in 1663 after renovation work. The selection of Grumbach as a residential seat in 1574 made it necessary for the village to have its own church for the lordly family who now lived here permanently. The chapel had a clocktower and a built-in organ. It seems likely that in the Middle Ages there was no actual chapel building, but rather it can be assumed that there was a room at the castle (an oriel, perhaps) that was used for church services. Officially, the Rhinegraviate converted to Lutheran belief in 1555, which still lies at the root of today’s ecclesiastical community. In 1762, an autonomous parish was founded to which also belonged the villages of Merzweiler and Hausweiler. It still exists today and includes not only those two places but also Hoppstädten and Kappeln. According to a census undertaken in 1808 in the then French departments on the Rhine’s left bank, there were then 30 Jews living in Grumbach. Grumbach got its own church in the years 1836-1838, which was built by Master Builder Leonhard from Sankt Wendel in an unusual spot: the one formerly occupied by the castle, high above the rest of the village. Here, the still preserved castle chapel was used at first, later branching out to the former Hofratshaus (courthouse, at Oberstraße 31). The church was made possible by an endowment from Prussian King Friedrich Wilhelm III at Rhinegravine Luise’s request. The background to this story supposedly lies in the time when Prussian Queen Luise had stayed in Grumbach in her youth. A contribution by Karl Friedrich Schinkel to the building, which is often mentioned in writings about the church, cannot be confirmed, although it is known that the plans were revised by the Oberbaudeputation (“Chief Building Deputation”) at Berlin, on which Schinkel sat. The parish belongs to the Sankt Wendel church district in the Evangelical Church in the Rhineland. The Catholic Christians are tended by the parish of Offenbach. Likewise, the New Apostolic Church has a parish seat in the village.

== Politics ==
=== Municipal council ===
The council is made up of 12 council members, who were elected by majority vote at the municipal election held on 7 June 2009, and the honorary mayor as chairman.

=== Mayor ===
Grumbach’s mayor is Markus Christian.

=== Coat of arms ===
Municipal arms

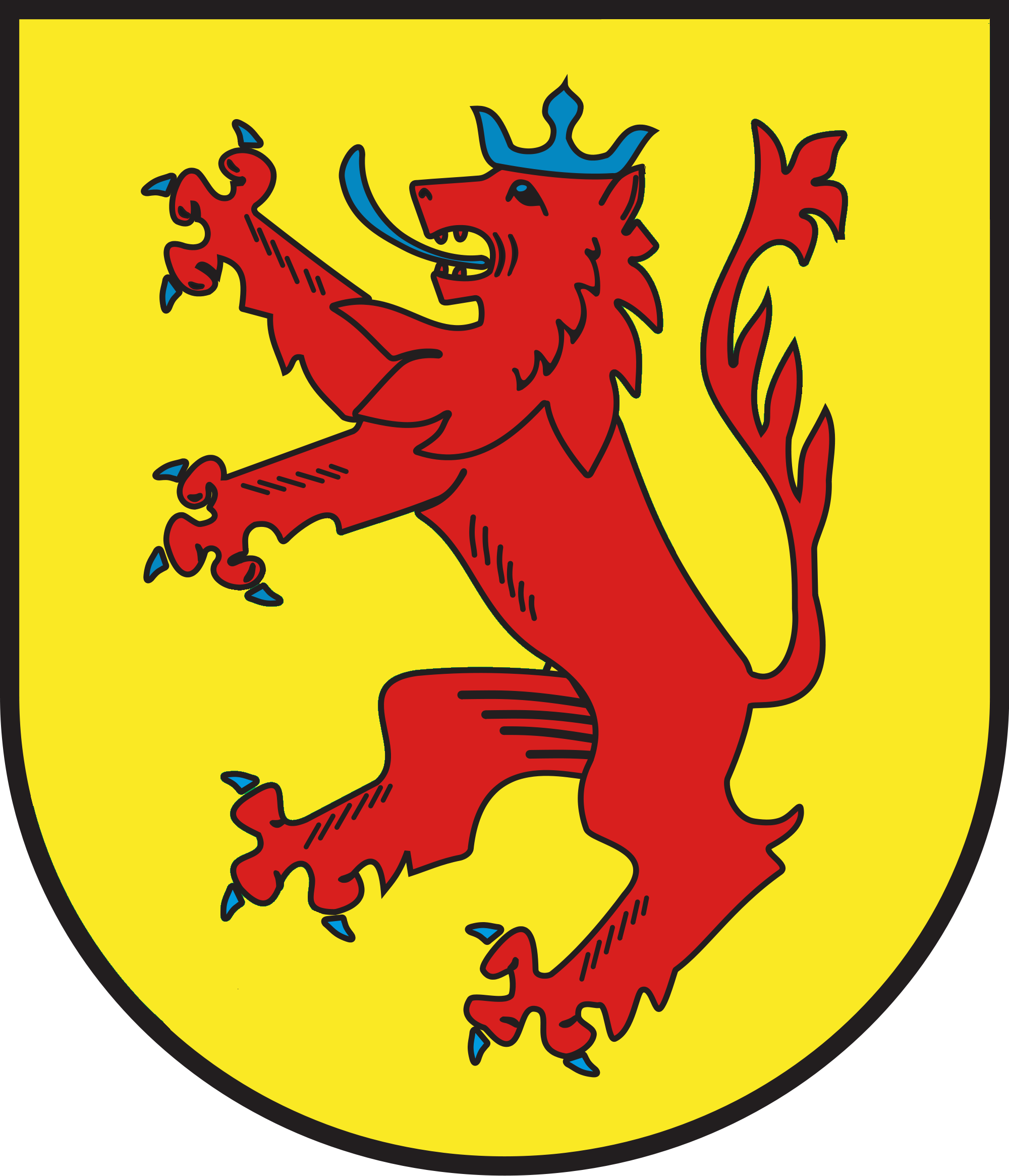
Waldgravial arms

The German blazon reads: In Gold ein grüner Wellenschrägbalken belegt mit einem blaubewehrten, blaubezungten und blaugekrönten roten Löwen.

The municipality’s arms might in English heraldic language be described thus: Or surmounting a bend sinister wavy vert a lion rampant gules armed, langued and crowned azure.

The arms were officially granted on 16 March 1929 by the Prussian Ministry of State after the municipality had been granted leave to bear arms on 8 October 1928 by Prince Otto zu Salm-Horstmar at Schloss Varlar near Coesfeld. They are the same as arms once borne by the Waldgraves of Dhaun, but with an extra charge: the “bend sinister wavy vert” (diagonal wavy green stripe) is a canting charge for the last syllable, —bach, in the municipality’s name (Bach means “brook” in German). The charge’s tincture, vert (green), is also canting for the name’s first syllable, at least if folk etymology is to be taken seriously (see Municipality’s name above). This holds that the village’s name means “Green Brook”. The Waldgravial lion appeared in Grumbach’s earliest known seal in the 16th century. The Waldgravial lion in the current arms is a reference not only to the village’s former allegiance to the Waldgraviate-Rhinegraviate, but also to Grumbach’s former status as that noble family’s residential seat. In the 1920s, Otto Hupp’s illustration of the municipality’s arms (see Coffee Hag albums) came in two versions: one with the bend sinister wavy vert and one without. The latter would have been heraldically identical to the old Waldgravial arms. Grumbach’s arms also match those once borne by the Amt, although in that case, the escutcheon also bore a bordure chequy of fourteen argent and sable (that is, a border with fourteen pieces alternating between silver and black). The number indicated the number of villages belonging to the Amt while the tinctures indicated Prussian allegiance.

== Culture and sightseeing ==
=== Buildings ===
The following are listed buildings or sites in Rhineland-Palatinate’s Directory of Cultural Monuments:

- Evangelical parish church, Auf dem Schloß 9 – Classicist aisleless church with porch and disused tower, 1836–1838, architect Municipal Master Builder Leonhard, Sankt Wendel; Stumm organ) from 1863
- Village centre, Auf dem Schloß, Friedhofweg, In der Hohl, Oberstraße, Sonnhofweg, Unterstraße, Weiherdamm (monumental zone) – historic village centre that grew together from the centres of Grumbach-Tal and Grumbach-Schloß; largely closed built-up area on basements along streets parallel to the slope going steeply up the Schlossberg, building materials from the 18th and 19th centuries, characterizes village’s appearance
- Schloßberg, Auf dem Schloß, Oberstraße (monumental zone) – of the Waldgravial castle built in the 13th century only the so-called archive building and foundation walls preserved, of the Rhinegravial castle parts of the former tithe barn (Oberstraße 33), one other barn (Oberstraße 34 and 35) and archive’s upper floor (Auf dem Schloß 15) preserved, in the west pleasure garden, on its north side five-axis unfinished new castle building (Sonnhofweg 4)
- Auf dem Schloß 3, 5 – former Prussian Amt court; originally freestanding block building (today plastered), before 1834, adjoining triaxial gabled block building, 1879
- Auf dem Schloß 8 – so-called Rhinegravial archive building; three-floor plastered building, essentially from the 16th century, newer in-between floor, open loggia and mansard roof, marked 1722, conversion 1879
- Oberstraße 14 – former noble estate; spacious Late Baroque building with half-hipped roof, marked 1780, stable-barn 1781
- Oberstraße 31 – so-called Hofratsgebäude (“Estate Council Building”); spacious building with half-hipped roof on high basement, 18th century, essentially possibly older; characterizes village’s appearance
- Oberstraße 33, 34, 35 – former commercial estate; barn complex, before 1631, conversion in the 18th century; no. 33 three- and one-floor tithe barn, dendrochronologically dated to 1766; nos. 34’s and 35’s basements possibly from the 17th century
- At Sonnenhofweg 8 – coat of arms of the Rhinegraves at Grumbach; squared armorial stone with fitted inescutcheon
- Unter dem Schloß 1 – building with half-hipped roof, partly timber-frame, marked 1779, one-floor addition with half-hipped roof, possibly not as old; characterizes village’s appearance
- Unter dem Schloß 3 – Late Baroque building with mansard roof, partly timber-frame, about 1792

=== Regular events ===
On the last Sunday in August 1838, the newly built church was festively consecrated, in memory of which, the three-day kermis (church consecration festival) has been held on this same weekend every year since then. For several years now, a Christmas Market has been held on the second Sunday in Advent. This has become greatly popular, not only among villagers, but also among visitors from surrounding areas. This may be due not least of all to the market’s ambience; it is held underground in the castle’s huge, preserved cellars. The event is sponsored by the municipality and the club community.

=== Clubs ===
Grumbach has a club community in which several clubs have banded together. The village volunteer fire brigade can look back on a long history in which in a 1758 fire edict another such brigade, albeit not staffed by volunteers, is mentioned, one that even at that early date held importance beyond the municipality’s limits. This was run right up until 1972 as the Amtsfeuerwehr Grumbach/Glan, but had to yield its functions to today’s Stützpunktwehr (a kind of support brigade that can function as a local fire brigade and also be called upon by other nearby municipalities for support) in Lauterecken. The local brigade is to this day a key centre for the municipalities of Herren-Sulzbach, Homberg, Unterjeckenbach and Langweiler. Joining the fire brigade in 1926 was a fire brigade band, which recorded successes, especially in the 1980s, when it won the gold medal at the competition in Hanover. At that time, the band formed together with Alzey the State Musical Corps of the Fire Brigades of Rhineland-Palatinate. The Grumbach singing club can likewise look back on a long history; its founding date was 1845. Founded as a men’s singing club and now mixed, it is one of the Palatinate’s oldest clubs of its kind. Not long after this was founded, in 1860, the Grumbach gymnastic club was founded, giving it, too, a stately age.

=== Sport and leisure ===
The most prominent event in club history was the building of the former gymnasium, which is now the community centre. The imposing timber-frame building, originally a casino for French officers in Landau and acquired from that town, was dedicated at Whitsun in 1932. Worth mentioning is the Rötelsbusch sporting ground facility laid out in 1961–1968, which nowadays has a spacious clubhouse. Looking back on an even longer history than the gymnastic club, albeit not a continuous one, is the public Evangelical library at the village’s old rectory. A forerunner had already been founded by 1819.

== Economy and infrastructure ==
=== Economic structure ===
In the end, it was economic factors that were responsible for settlement at the foot of the castle and for raising the village above the mainly agriculturally structured surrounding countryside that belonged to the castle’s holders, although a townsman-farmer (German: ackerbürgerlich) character nevertheless prevailed. The “townsman” part should not be taken literally, however, as there was no civic autonomy in the early days. The centralization of administration saw to a corresponding infrastructure. History records in 1385 hostels in the dale below the castle and that the lordly pledgeholders of the castle did not buy very much. The rise to town in 1330 brought no noticeable upswing in population figures, which bobbed up and down through the centuries. Change was brought by the founding of the lordly residence, although the decades-long wars that soon followed thwarted any economic development. In 1613, a weekly market was started, and in 1614 a yearly market, although records do not mention this again until 1689. That same year, four Jews are mentioned living in the dale who enjoyed special immunity, even in matters of trade. The catastrophic economic conditions in the village caused the lordship in 1708 to institute support measures, which actually began to take effect in the decades that followed. In the latter half of the century, prosperity took hold, which for such a small village yielded an improbably great variety of occupations, with even such specialized occupations as wigmaker, goldsmith and bookbinder being found in Grumbach. The beginning process of consolidating the Rhinegraviate was brought to an end by the consequences of the French Revolution. The short Saxe-Coburg period brought the village nothing short of idleness, with the investment that the Principality of Lichtenberg badly needed never showing up. The Prussian takeover ended the time of stagnation. Grumbach, though, remained first and foremost an administrative centre, and great business concerns simply did not arise here as they did in, for example, Offenbach, which lay in the same Amt. Agriculture, crafts and small business, alongside service businesses and the civil service, characterized the village’s relatively lively business life, such that by the mid 20th century there were some 50 shops in Grumbach of all different kinds. The quarry found within municipal limits grew into the biggest employer and earned regional importance, at times employing up to 180 workers. Nevertheless, jobs were being lost in the civil service. First the customs office was lost in 1930, then the land registry office in 1937 and next the Amt court and notary’s office in 1952. Increasing mobility resulted in the typical commuting in Grumbach, as in so many places, leading to a corresponding drop in farming’s importance. It became, if anything, a secondary occupation, and then agricultural businesses began to be shut down. Only two fulltime agricultural operations are to be found today in Grumbach, and they both lie in the outlying centre of Windhof, and one also offers “holidays down on the farm”, which is greatly in demand. Trade and crafts, on the other hand, were brought to an end with the dissolution of the Amt and the consequent shift of administrative functions to the nearby and economically stronger town of Lauterecken. Over the last 30 years, Grumbach has evolved into a purely residential community, where even such basic craft businesses as baker and butcher are no longer to be found.

=== Education ===
Surviving from Rhinegravial times are records of a 1598 school system, although it seems that Grumbach did not have its own school building. It is, rather, reported that schoolchildren had to attend the school in Herren-Sulzbach. This changed in the course of the 18th century when, by way of an apparent bequest from the French language teacher Gilbret am Hofe, the municipality found itself in a position to build its own schoolhouse. It was built at Oberstraße 21, a building now used as a private house. It was also attended by schoolchildren from Hausweiler. After the French auctioned off all goods and landholds seized from the Rhinegraves, school lessons were moved to the Hofratshaus (courthouse) at Oberstraße 31, a building that is still under municipal ownership even today. It was also here, in 1819, that a cantonal library was set up and subsequently run by whoever led the school. It also contained a special teachers’ library. In 1848, it held 364 titles in all together 987 volumes. In the 1880s, there were two classes for all grade levels. In 1958, the still denominational Evangelical Volksschule moved to a newly built school building in the village’s north end, although by the time of school reform in 1966, it was converted into a Grundschule (non-denominational primary school). This stood as the Grundschule Grumbach-Hoppstädten and was closed in 2010. In the 1980s, a school gymnasium was built, which can also be used by local clubs. Today, primary school pupils and Hauptschule students attend the corresponding schools in Lauterecken.

=== Transport ===
Important to the way in which transport shaped the political situation is the road on the heights north of Grumbach, known to have been there as early as Roman times. Nothing about this situation changed from the Middle Ages until the latter half of the 18th century, for only then did the local lords actively begin to wage roadbuilding politics. The old network of tracks and paths were used for a long time. There were the track to Hausweiler, the Sonnhofweg to Kappeln and the Roman road and onwards to Meisenheim, the Schlossbergweg to Merzweiler and Langweiler, the Pfaffensteg to Sulzbach and the Hettengraben to Buborn. A measure that was very important was the expansion of the road to Lauterecken, which made the centuries-old snaking alignment of Unterstraße and Oberstraße obsolete, and made the latter into more of a “Hauptstraße” (“Main Street”). A survey undertaken on the occasion of Saxe-Coburg’s 1816 takeover confirmed the Canton of Grumbach road network’s bad condition. There was a main road running the length of the later principality from Sankt Wendel to Grumbach that near the village still used the former Roman roadbed and that reached Grumbach by way of the street called Am Schlossberg (which is nowadays not even a through road). Here, in 1836, a courier service travelled thrice weekly between Baumholder and Grumbach, on Mondays, Wednesdays and Fridays. Only in Prussian times, between 1840 and 1855, was the road to Langweiler, still heavily used today, built. The condition of the road link between the Glan and Nahe valleys, which led through the village, was at that time quite poor and the upgrade to today’s Bundesstraße 270 only came about after the Second World War. The growing trend towards motorization led to the need for this road, which until the early 1960s still ran through the village, to be realigned. There had been some catastrophic accidents in Grumbach’s narrow streets. The bypass nowadays runs along the bottom of the dale. The village got a railway station in the form of Lauterecken-Grumbach station, 3 km away. It opened along with the Glan Valley Railway (Glantalbahn) on 1 May 1904, not least of all to make possible the construction of the stretch of line disputed between Prussia and Bavaria. Lauterecken-Grumbach station still operates as a station on the Lauter Valley Railway (Lautertalbahn).

== Famous people ==
=== Sons and daughters of the town ===
- Friedrich Kasimir Medikus, or Friedrich Casimir Medicus (b. 1736 in Grumbach; d. 1808 in Mannheim) — physician and botanist. Born as Waldgravial-Rhinegravial government official Christian Walrad Medicus’s son, he first studied medicine in Tübingen and Heidelberg and became a physician. As a result of his botanical studies, he received an appointment at the Academy of Sciences at Mannheim, where, among other things, he participated in setting up the botanical garden. He also took part in founding the Kameralschule (a vocational school) in Kaiserslautern.
- Waldgrave and Rhinegrave Karl August (b. 1742 in Grumbach; d. 1800 in Philippsburg) — field marshal-lieutenant. He was one of reigning Rhinegrave Karl Walrad Wilhelm’s 17 children and in later years commanded the troops of the Franconian Circle. From this position, he became commandant and the last defender of the fort at Philippsburg, which even earned him his French opponents’ respect. When the enemy was firing on the fort, he helped protect the citizens’ lives and property and also secured for them 100,000 Gulden so that they could rebuild their homes. In his memory, a stone pyramid stands at the graveyard, and to this day there is a club called “Graf von Salm”.
- Dr. Wilhelm Boden (b. 1890 in Grumbach; d. 1961 in Birnbach) — politician (CDU), minister-president. His father Constantin was a notary in Grumbach before the family moved to Trier in 1894. He studied legal and social sciences in Bonn and Berlin, graduating in 1912. The centrist politician was, beginning in 1919, Landrat (district chairman) in the Altenkirchen district, but was removed by the Nazis in 1933. After he reoccupied this position after the Second World War, he also acceded from Regierungspräsident (head of a Regierungsbezirk) of Koblenz to Oberregierungspräsident of Rhineland-Hesse-Nassau. On 1 December 1946, he was appointed Minister-President of the then newly founded state of Rhineland-Palatinate. It was not long, though, before coalition difficulties ostensibly led him to withdraw from the position on 7 July 1947 to take on the office of President of the Landeszentralbank (“State Central Bank”), which he held until 1959.
- Prof. Dr. Paul Wilhelm Massing (b. 1902 in Grumbach; d. 1979 in Tübingen) — sociologist. Paul W. Massing was active in the inner circle of the so-called Frankfurt School as its only non-Jewish member. The “school” was a group of scientists under the auspices of Theodor W. Adorno and Max Horkheimer in exile in the United States that supposedly characterized whole generations of sociologists. After his studies in national economics and political science in Frankfurt, he earned his doctorate. Here he also forged contacts at the Institute for Social Research, which would characterize his later life. With the rise of the Third Reich, he was at first confined in a concentration camp, but later managed to emigrate by way of France to the United States. There he was appointed full professor at Rutgers University in New Jersey. After he became professor emeritus, he returned to Grumbach. A planned study of the local inhabitants’ relationship with the Nazi régime, however, could not be completed.
- Dr. Paul Eckel (b. 1900 in Grumbach; d. 1971 in Hanover) — medical scientist, President of the World Medical Association. After his medical studies at Heidelberg came his licensing as a physician, whereupon he pursued further training as a specialist in radiology and radiotherapy in Berlin. Besides various other activities, he was appointed in 1955 to the board of the German Medical Association, eventually becoming its vice-president in 1959. In 1960 and 1961, he was President of the World Medical Association and as such had to lead the executive board in Berlin.
