= Unterjeckenbach =

- Municipality
- Coat of arms

- Location of Unterjeckenbach within Kusel district
- Interactive map of Unterjeckenbach
- Location within Germany Location within Rhineland-Palatinate
- Coordinates: 49°39′50″N 7°29′28″E
- Country: Germany
- State: Rhineland-Palatinate
- District: Kusel
- Municipal assoc.: Lauterecken-Wolfstein

Government
  - Mayor (2019–24): Timo Theis

Area
  - Total: 7.38 km^{2} (2.85 sq mi)
- Elevation: 340 m (1,120 ft)

Population (2025-12-31)
  - Total: 63
  - Density: 8.5/km^{2} (22/sq mi)
- Time zone: UTC+01:00 (CET)
  - Summer (DST): UTC+02:00 (CEST)
- Postal codes: 67746
- Dialling codes: 06788
- Vehicle registration: KUS

Unterjeckenbach is an Ortsgemeinde – a municipality belonging to a Verbandsgemeinde, a kind of collective municipality – in the Kusel district in Rhineland-Palatinate, Germany. It belongs to the Verbandsgemeinde Lauterecken-Wolfstein.

== Geography ==
=== Location ===
Unterjeckenbach lies on the Jeckenbach between the Palatinate Forest and the Hunsrück. It lies in the narrow valley of the Jeckenbach (Rosental) some 320 m above sea level, stretching partly towards the mountain slope on the stream's left bank. The elevation around the village reaches more than 400 m above sea level in places; the Gerhardsberg peaks at 454.5 m above sea level. Just above the village is the edge of the Baumholder Troop Drilling Ground. Unterjeckenbach's "twin", Oberjeckenbach, once lay about a kilometre away, but it was swallowed up in 1933 when the troop drilling ground was laid out by the Nazis.

The municipal area measures 315 ha, of which 24 ha is wooded and 6 ha is given over to habitation.

=== Neighbouring municipalities ===
Unterjeckenbach borders in the north on the municipality of Sien in the east on the municipality of Langweiler, in the south on the municipality of Homberg and in the west on the Baumholder troop drilling ground.

=== Municipality’s layout ===
The village's houses stand along two streets, of which one runs east-west, parallel to the brook, and the other northwards up from the brook into a side valley. Down from this road lies the village graveyard.

== History ==
=== Antiquity ===
The area around the village was already settled in prehistoric times. Before the Second World War, villagers found several Stone Age axes, which were long kept in the village schoolhouse. No Roman archaeological finds are known.

=== Middle Ages ===
Unterjeckenbach was founded in one of the later expansion phases of the Frankish taking of the land, likely in the 8th century. It originally belonged to the Nahegau, and later lay within the jurisdiction of the Hochgericht auf der Heide ("High Court on the Heath"), and aside from the odd period when it was pledged, it was under the lordship of the Waldgraves and Rhinegraves throughout the Middle Ages. At first, Unterjeckenbach shared its history with the neighbouring village of Oberjeckenbach. In 1319, it was decided in a legal adjudication that Waldgrave Friedrich von der Kyrburg had claims in the villages around Grumbach, and thus in the two Jeckenbachs, but only a share in the Blutbann (blood court district) and the High Court on the Heath, and no further rightful claims. The Waldgraves pledged the two villages in 1363 to the Counts of Sponheim-Starkenburg, but sometime later bought them back. That latter deed shows that Rhinegrave Friedrich of Dhaun had in 1443 transferred "the poor people of Grumbach" (and hence all the surrounding villages) for protection to Count Friedrich III of Veldenz and his successor (for Count Friedrich died the very next year along with his noble house), Count Palatine Stephan of Zweibrücken. Among these villages where "the poor people" lived was quite possibly Unterjeckenbach, but not Oberjeckenbach. In 1448, Grumbach itself along with the villages already named was pledged to the newly founded County Palatine of Zweibrücken. The village known in that same year as Freyjeckenbach – the prefix, spelt frei in modern German, means "free" – was so called because the villagers did not have to pay any taxes. In 1477, this Amt of Grumbach had its pledge redeemed by the Waldgraves. Oberjeckenbach had in the meantime been pledged to the Lords of Löwenstein.

=== Modern times ===
It was in 1575 that the independent Rhinegravial House of Grumbach arose. As to whether the village was further sold or pledged, nothing is known. Unterjeckenbach thereafter belonged to this noble house. During the Thirty Years' War, the village suffered its share of misery and hardship. Since the establishment of the troop drilling ground by the Nazis in 1933, the village has lain at the end of a short sideroad. Formerly, there was a well used linking road between the Glan and the Nahe through the Jeckenbach valley. Places on such thoroughfares were especially prone to plundering by troops passing through the area. Both Unterjeckenbach and Oberjeckenbach, as well as Hohenroth up on the mountain, were repeatedly burnt down and robbed as Croatian troops of the Imperial Army passed through the area in 1635. The Plague, too, claimed many victims. It is clear that Unterjeckenbach had died out by 1642; the 1684 Herren-Sulzbach church register no longer even mentioned the village. Just before the turn of the 18th century, newcomers arrived and began to resettle Unterjeckenbach. Foremost were settlers from the Tyrol, among them an Emich Gehres, who became the father of a widespread "Gehres Family". For a while sometime later, half the villagers bore this surname. In the 18th century, Unterjeckenbach experienced a pleasant upswing.

==== Recent times ====
During the time of the French Revolution and the Napoleonic Era that followed, the German lands on the Rhine’s left bank, and thereby Unterjeckenbach too, were annexed by France. Unterjeckenbach then belonged to the Mairie ("Mayoralty") of Grumbach, while Grumbach itself was the seat of a canton, which in turn belonged to the Arrondissement of Birkenfeld in the Department of Sarre. As early as 1793, French Revolutionary troops advanced through the Glan valley and stationed themselves in the villages around Grumbach, including Unterjeckenbach. In 1816, in the wake of the Congress of Vienna, Unterjeckenbach passed to the Principality of Lichtenberg, a newly created exclave of the Duchy of Saxe-Coburg-Saalfeld, which as of 1826 became the Duchy of Saxe-Coburg and Gotha. As part of this state, it passed by sale in 1834 to the Kingdom of Prussia, which made this area into the Sankt Wendel district. Later, after the First World War, the Treaty of Versailles stipulated, among other things, that 26 of the Sankt Wendel district's 94 municipalities had to be ceded to the British- and French-occupied Saarland. The remaining 68 municipalities then bore the designation "Restkreis St. Wendel-Baumholder", with the first syllable of Restkreis having the same meaning as in English, in the sense of "left over". Unterjeckenbach belonged to this district until 1937, when it was transferred to the Birkenfeld district, which was formed by merging the Restkreis with the old, smaller Birkenfeld district that had until then been part of Oldenburg. In 1969, it was transferred, this time to the Kusel district, in which it remains today.

Under Rhineland-Palatinate's Landesgesetz über die Auflösung des Gutsbezirks Baumholder und seine kommunale Neugliederung (roughly "State Law For Dissolving the Regional Estate of Baumholder and Annexing It to Municipalities") on 2 November 1993 (GVBl. S. 518), the former municipal area of the long vanished village of Oberjeckenbach – the Nazis had evacuated it in 1933 for military purposes – was annexed to Unterjeckenbach with effect from 1 January 1994.

=== Population development ===
Unterjeckenbach has remained rurally structured to this day. Until a few decades ago, the greater part of the village's livelihood earned its living at agriculture. Besides farmers, there were also forestry workers and a few craftsmen. Farming employs only a few workers nowadays. Members of the workforce are obliged to seek work elsewhere.

The following table shows population development since Napoleonic times for Unterjeckenbach:

Year	1815	1860	1900	1925	1958	2000	2007
Total	70	201	216	181	173	110	92

=== Municipality’s name ===
In a 1319 document, the two villages of Oberjeckenbach and Unterjeckenbach are called "both Jeckenbachs". In another document, from 1363, they are called the "two Jeckenbachs". Particular names for Unterjeckenbach then also crop up in the historical records, such as Sienjeckenbach (1448, after neighbouring Sien) and Frygechenbach (1448). In old writings, and even today in the local speech, the "two Jeckenbachs" are also called Geckenbach. According to writers Dolch and Greule, the name unites the ending —bach ("brook") with the prefix Gago, believed to be an early settler's name.

=== Vanished villages ===
The pertinent writings bring to light no vanished villages within Unterjeckenbach's limits, unless the village of Oberjeckenbach is counted. This was evacuated after Adolf Hitler came to power in 1933, along with 14 other villages in the region, to make way for the Baumholder troop drilling ground. Oberjeckenbach lay roughly one kilometre from Unterjeckenbach.

== Religion ==
Unterjeckenbach might have belonged to the parish of Herren-Sulzbach from the Early Middle Ages. The village never had its own church. Hence, Unterjeckenbach's ecclesiastical history is shared with Herren-Sulzbach. Beginning in the late 13th century, the Knights of Saint John held great influence over the Waldgravial-Rhinegravial noble house. Introduced into the lordship of Grumbach in 1556 was the Reformation, and the Evangelical parish of Herren-Sulzbach was founded, to which Unterjeckenbach has belonged ever since. Until the Thirty Years' War, all the villagers were Evangelical. Later, the feudal lords tolerated other denominations, although these earned no special importance. Even today, the village is overwhelmingly Evangelical.

== Politics ==
=== Municipal council ===
The council is made up of 6 council members, who were elected by majority vote at the municipal election held on 7 June 2009, and the honorary mayor as chairman.

=== Mayor ===
Unterjeckenbach's mayor is Timo Theis.

=== Coat of arms ===
The municipality's arms might be described thus: Per bend sinister Or a lion rampant sinister gules armed and langued azure and azure a village well with a trough, to sinister chief a bend wavy enhanced, all of the first.

The red lion charge is drawn from the arms formerly borne by the Waldgraves, under whose lordship Unterjeckenbach once lay. The wavy bend (diagonal stripe) refers to the Jeckenbach, the brook that flows by the village. The well refers to one that is still preserved in the village.

== Culture and sightseeing ==
=== Regular events ===
Unterjeckenbach's kermis (church consecration festival) is held on the fifth weekend in June.

== Economy and infrastructure ==
=== Economic structure ===
Until the mid 20th century, the villagers earned their livelihood mainly at agriculture. Now that almost all agricultural work has been given up, many workers go to jobs outside the municipality. Already by 1960, out of 52 members of the workforce, 41 had to commute to work. Before the troop drilling ground was laid out, Unterjeckenbach's location with regard to transport was considerably more favourable than it is now. The Meisenheim-Idar road was crossed a few kilometres east of the village by the road that led from the Niederreidenbacher Hof (on the Nahe) directly to Lauterecken, and which has since, after considerable expansion work, been raised to Bundesstraße (B 270). Now leading west of the village is the so-called Platzrandstraße ("Place Edge Road" – the "place" being the troop drilling ground), which runs round the drilling ground and is open only to military traffic. The former Amt seat of Grumbach lies 5 km away, and to the town of Lauterecken, now the Verbandsgemeinde seat, it is 8 km. Even less favourable are the Autobahn links: it is roughly 40 km to the interchange near Kusel, 45 km to the one near Kaiserslautern and 50 km to the one near Wöllstein.

=== Education ===
As in the other villages in the Amt of Grumbach, there arose in Unterjeckenbach, as an effect of the Reformation movement towards the end of the 16th century, the first efforts to bring reading and writing to the region's children. Originally, the children from had to attend school in neighbouring Herren-Sulzbach. In the 18th century, a winter teacher was also hired in Unterjeckenbach. Gottfried Kirrbach, who was from Saxony, was the village's first schoolteacher. Children were taught in a private home. In 1873, the municipality got its own schoolhouse. Today's young learners go to primary school and Hauptschule in Lauterecken, after primary school pupils had had to go to Grumbach-Hoppstädten between 1969 and 2010. The nearest Gymnasium is in Lauterecken.

=== Transport ===
To the east runs Bundesstraße 270. Serving Lauterecken is a railway station on the Lautertalbahn.
