= Kermesse (festival) =

Fair or festival in the Low Countries

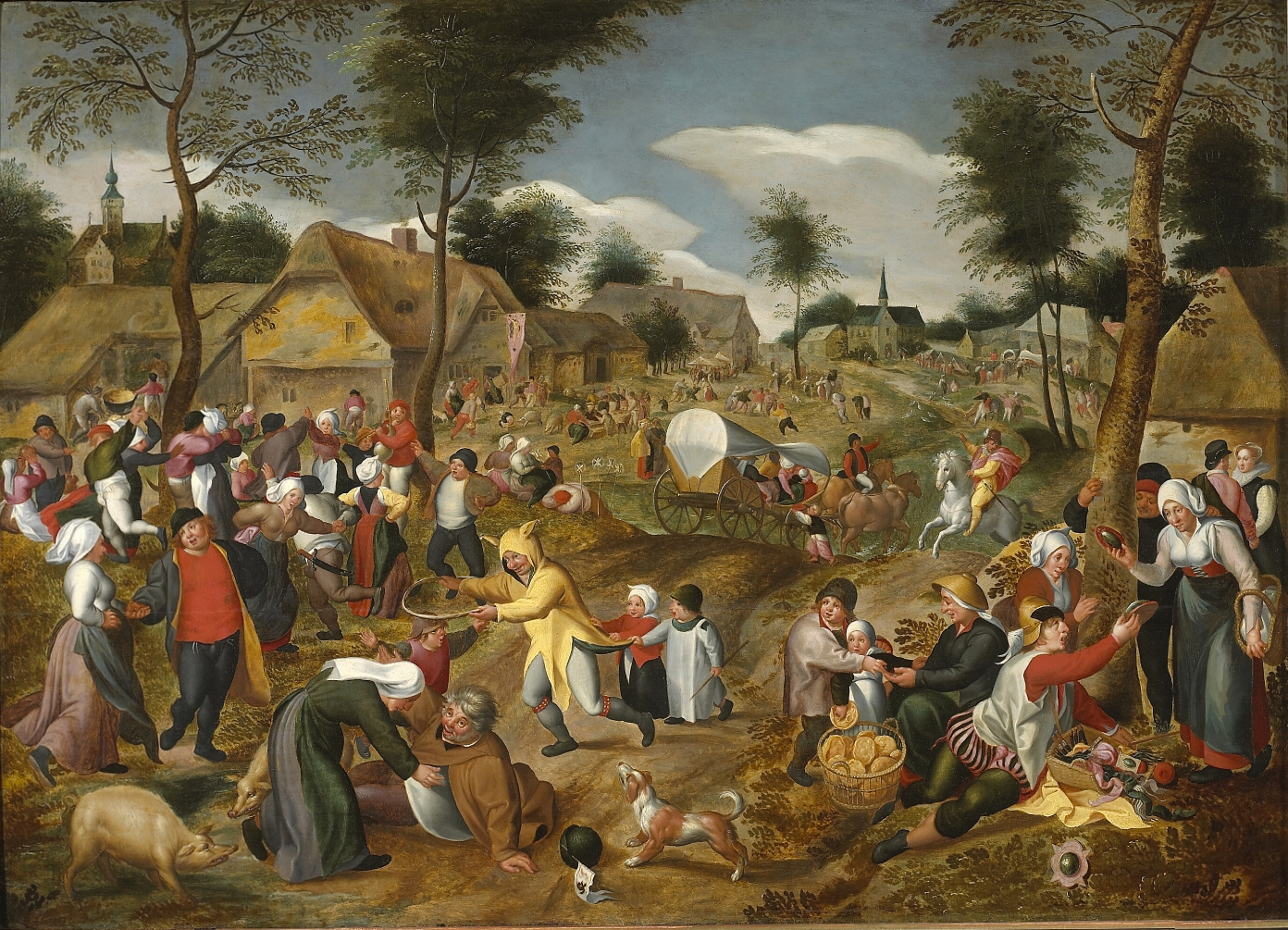
Kermesse by Marten van Cleve, c. 1591–1600

Kermesse, or kermis, or kirmess, is an outdoor fair or festival usually organized for charitable purposes. The term was derived from 'kerk' (church) and 'mis' (mass) in the original Dutch language term, and was borrowed into English, French, Spanish and many other languages. It originally denoted a mass and patronal festival held on the anniversary of the foundation of a church (or the parish) and in honour of the patron saint. Such celebrations were regularly held in the Low Countries, in Central Europe and also in northern France, and were accompanied by feasting, dancing and competitions of all kinds. The Kirchweih is the German equivalent, while church ale was a name of similar festivals in England. Many Catholic churches (parishes) still have patronal festivals of some sort for the anniversary of the church's founding, or the feast day of the saint it is dedicated to.

The kermesse became a common subject in Dutch and Flemish Renaissance painting in the 16th century, though many paintings called by the name were probably intended to depict village weddings.

== History ==
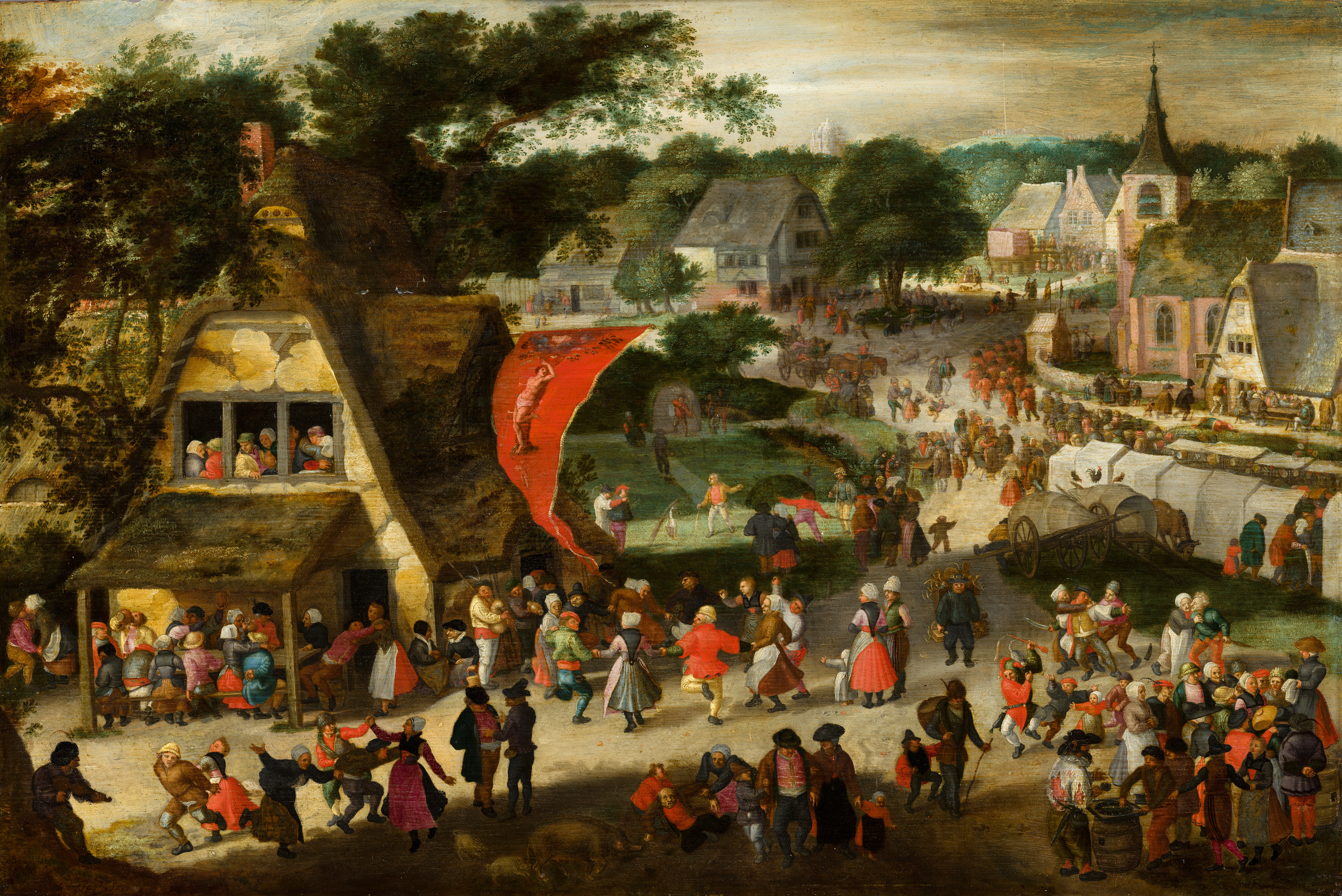
Fair on St Sebastian's Day, Jacob Savery, c. 1598

Arguably the first kermesse was an annual parade to mark the events of the Brussels massacre of 1370 (some sources say 1369) in Brussels, when the entire Jewish population of the city were burnt alive or expelled after being accused of profaning a basket of communion hosts, which were said to have bled when stabbed. According to one source, those Jewish residents who could prove that they did not profane the hosts were not killed, but were merely banished from Brussels.

These festivities still survive in the form of funfairs, while the old allegorical representations are now uncommon. Whereas nearly every village has a kermis once or twice a year, the large Zuidfoor or Foire du Midi (South Fair) of Brussels and Sinksenfoor (Whitsun Fair) of Antwerp attract many visitors during several weeks. The funfair on the Vrijdagmarkt in Ghent coincides with the 10-day long Gentse Feesten (Ghent Festivities) which are held across the entire inner city around 21 July (Belgian national holiday).

The standard Dutch language expression Vlaamse kermis (Flemish kermesse) once referred to the local village kermesse (as pronounced in the former County of Flanders) though its modern usage is mainly limited to privately organized fairs open to the public, often for fund-raising, such as by schools or youth organisations in the Flemish Region.

The crew of the Dutch ship Gelderland used the names "griff-eendt" and "kermisgans" for the dodo in 1598, in reference to fowl fattened for the Kermesse festival, which was held the day after they anchored on Mauritius.

== In art ==
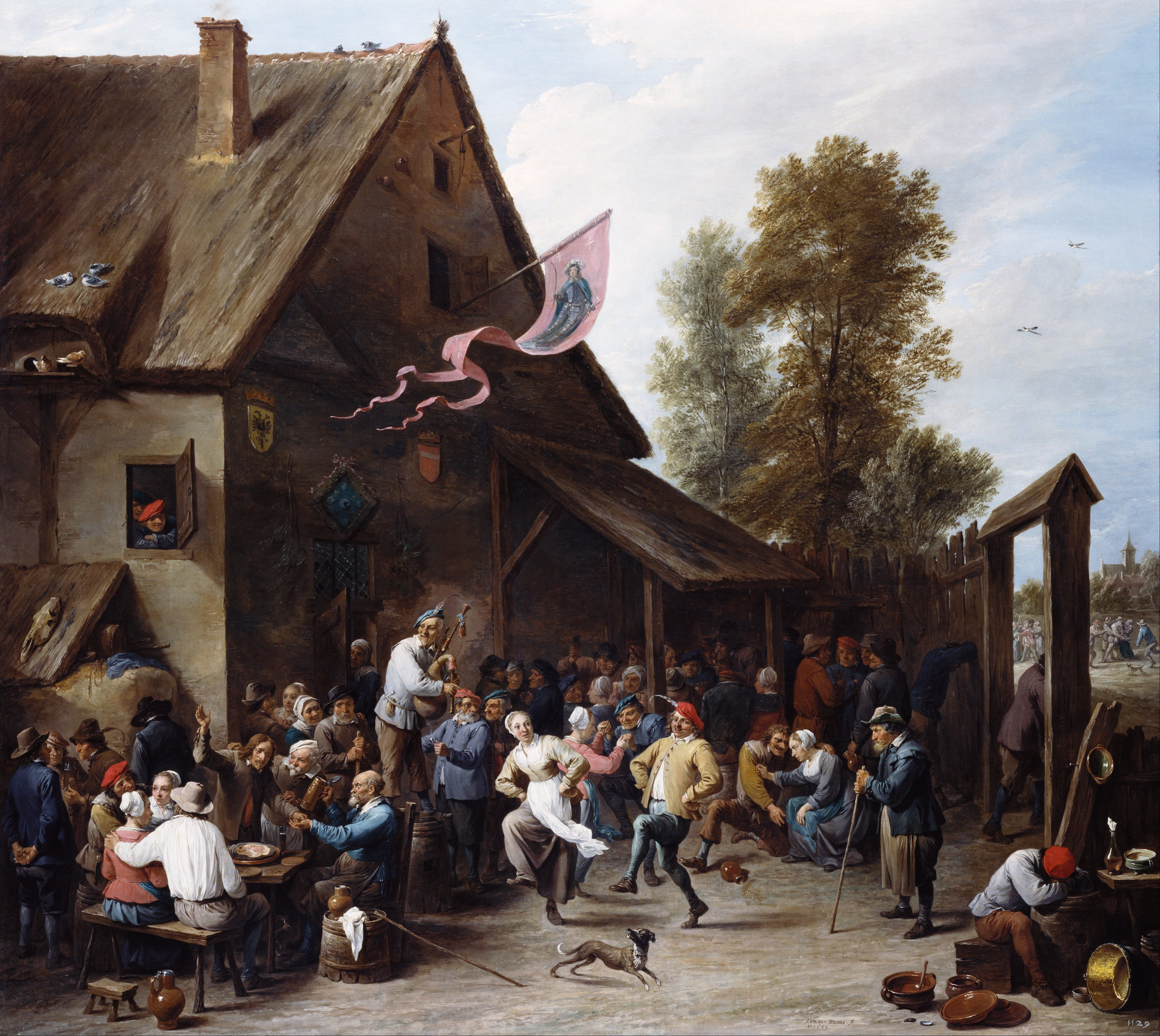
St George's Kermess by David Teniers the Younger (c. 1664–1667)

In Dutch and Flemish Renaissance painting, continuing into the Baroque period especially in the south, Kermesse scenes were a popular genre in painting. These typically show village festivities (perhaps in fact after a wedding or similar) with a few dozen figures dancing, drinking, and often flirting. Sometimes a few better-dressed figures look on. The genre develops a theme found in a smaller scale in the calendars of late-medieval illuminated manuscripts.

Pieter Bruegel the Elder (nicknamed "Peasant Bruegel" for his fondness for such subjects) was the main progenitor of the large painted kermesse, in works like The Wedding Dance (c. 1566, Detroit, with 125 figures) and The Peasant Dance (c. 1567, Vienna), which are thought to have made a set with the sit-down meal shown in The Peasant Wedding (c. 1567, Vienna). Most later works, many by his descendants, adopted the more distant view from slightly above that Bruegel had developed for other subjects, allowing a larger number of figures.

== Impact on other languages and cultures ==
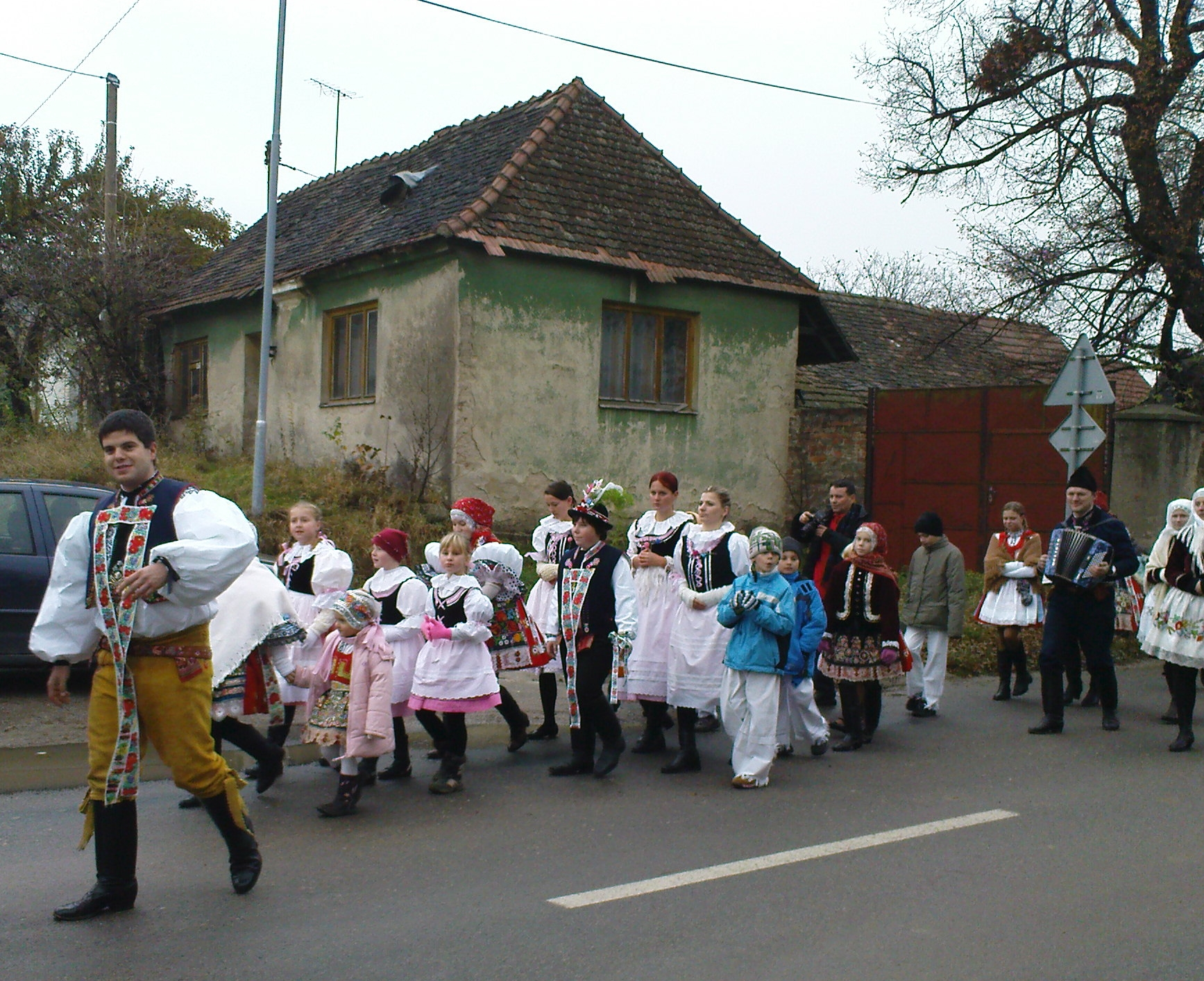
Kermesse in the Moravian Slovak village of Bohuslavice u Kyjova (Czech Republic, 2009) – a procession through the village is led by a "stárek" (festival leader) wearing a national costume, yellow deer-skin trousers

The word Kermess (generally in the form Kirmess) is applied in the United States to any entertainment, especially one organized in the interest of charity. The Dutch-American Village of Little Chute, Wisconsin, has celebrated Kermis annually since 1981. The Wallonian settlements in Door County, Wisconsin, also celebrate a "Kermis" with traditional Belgian dishes and events. Another American polity that celebrates this holiday is La Kermesse of Biddeford, Maine. The term "kirmess" was used in Staten Island in the late nineteenth century to denote an outdoor fundraising festival. The International School of Indiana, located in Indianapolis, Indiana, holds an annual Kermesse celebration with refreshments, carnival games and face-painting to celebrate the ending of the school year for their pre-elementary and elementary pupils. In the City of Halifax (Nova Scotia, Canada), a city with a limited Dutch heritage, kermesses have been held since 1907 as fundraisers for the local children's hospital. The École Française de Vancouver (ÉFIV) in North Vancouver, British Columbia (Canada), holds an annual kermesse with games, food, a pétanque tournament and community participation.

The term has also had an influence on Ibero-American culture. Specifically in Paraguay, Mexico, Peru, Bolivia, Argentina and Chile, "kermeses" are held by churches and schools to raise funds. Many activities take place including "tombolas" where people buy tickets for drawings that always have awards from very minor items to bigger awards. In Brazil "quermesses" are usually held by churches during the early weeks of winter and in celebration of the widely popular Festa Junina festivities.

The word also entered the Belarusian language as "кiрмаш" (kirmash) in the meaning of "fair". In Lithuanian language "kermošius" (kermoshius) means a fair after the mass in the church. Polish language uses word "kiermasz" which also started as a village church event but over time morphed into synonym for fair.

In Romanian "chermeză" means party or banquet.

In Italian "kermesse" means festival or show, especially one featuring many different acts.

In the Turkish language "kermes" is a sale of ladies' handiwork for charity.

== See also ==
- Carnival
- Event planning
- Fête
- Hot dog day
- Carl Schurz, Reminiscences, Volume I, Chap. II, pp. 44–45, has a paragraph where he recalls the tradition of the kirmess in early 19th century Rhenish Prussia.
- Kermesse (cycling)
