= Waldgrave =

German noble family

Arms of the Wildgraves at Kyrburg

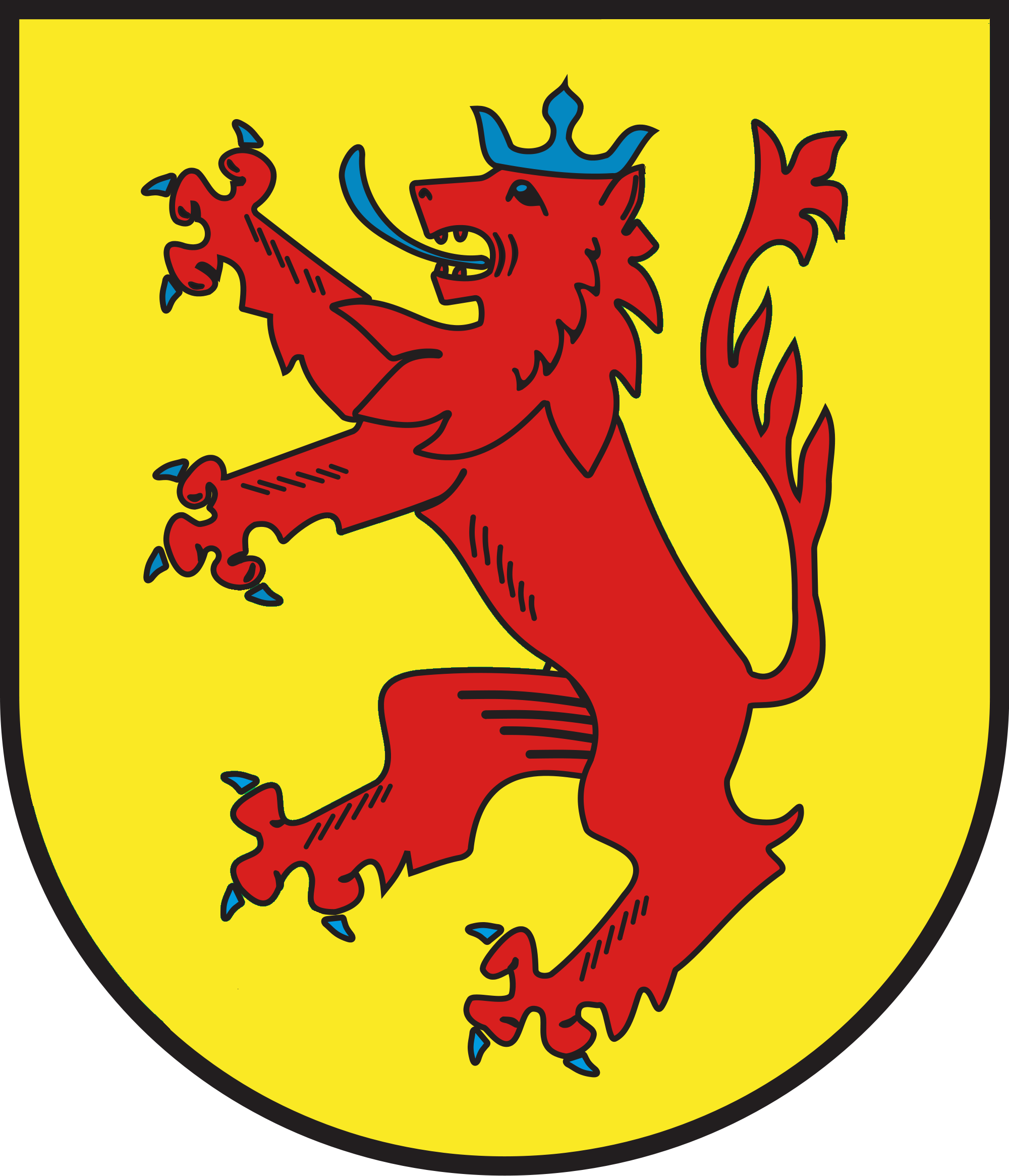
Arms of the Wildgraves at Dhaun

The first Waldgraves or Wildgraves (Latin: comites silvestres) descended from a division of the House of the Counts of Nahegau in the year 1113.

When the Nahegau (a countship named after the river Nahe) split into two parts in 1113, the counts of the two parts, belonging to the House of Salm, called themselves Wildgraves and Raugraves, respectively. They were named after the geographic properties of their territories: Wildgrave (German: Wildgraf; Latin: comes sylvanus) after Wald ("forest"), and Raugrave (German: Raugraf; Latin: comes hirsutus) after the rough (i.e. mountainous) terrain.
