= Talling =

- Municipality
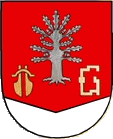
- Coat of arms

- Location of Talling within Bernkastel-Wittlich district
- Interactive map of Talling
- Location within Germany Location within Rhineland-Palatinate
- Coordinates: 49°45′38.45″N 6°57′11.27″E
- Country: Germany
- State: Rhineland-Palatinate
- District: Bernkastel-Wittlich
- Municipal assoc.: Thalfang am Erbeskopf

Government
  - Mayor (2019–24): Bettina Hoff

Area
  - Total: 3.9 km^{2} (1.5 sq mi)
- Elevation: 476 m (1,562 ft)

Population (2025-12-31)
  - Total: 245
  - Density: 63/km^{2} (160/sq mi)
- Time zone: UTC+01:00 (CET)
  - Summer (DST): UTC+02:00 (CEST)
- Postal codes: 54426
- Dialling codes: 06504
- Vehicle registration: WIL
- Website: www.talling.de

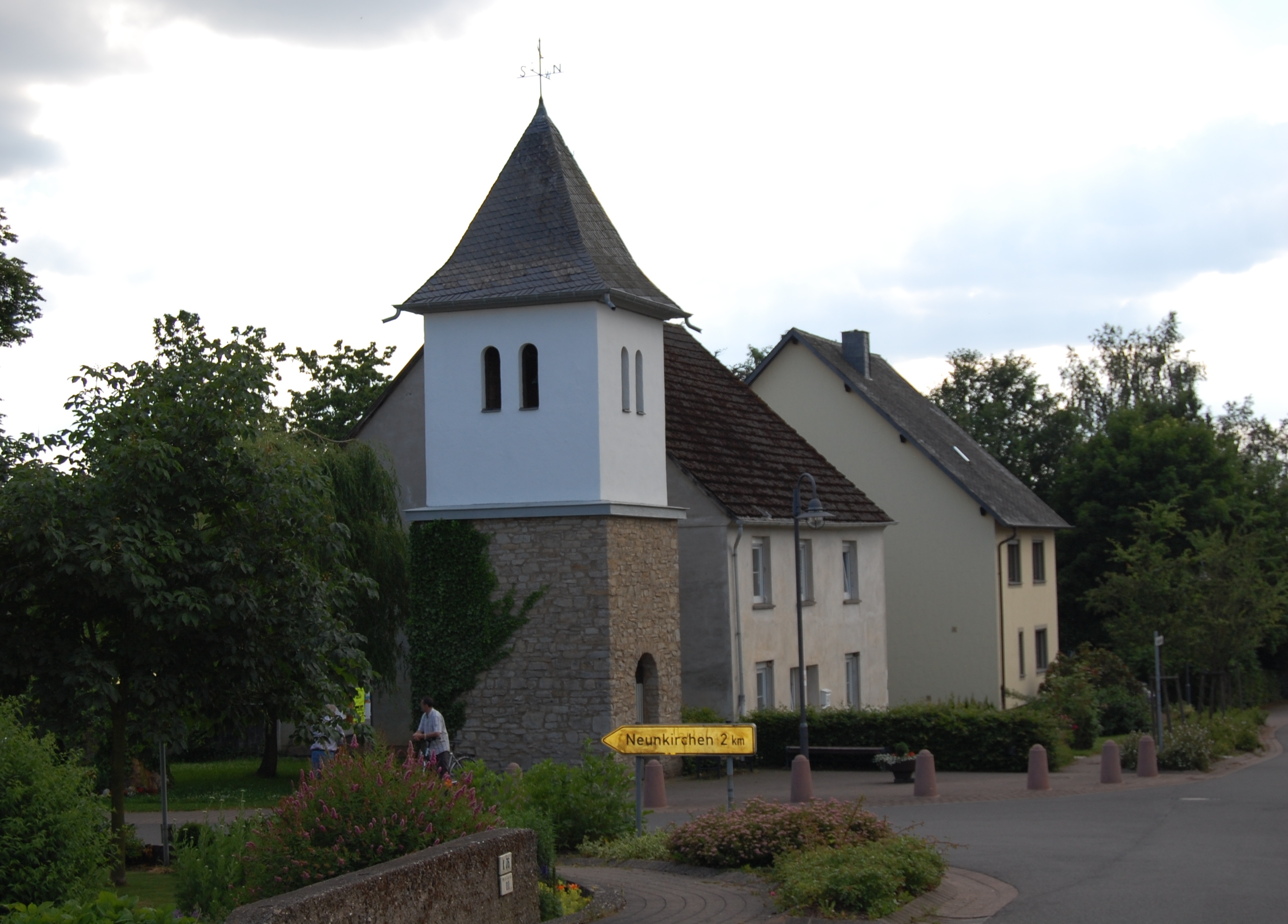
Belltower in the village centre

Talling (German pronunciation: [ˈtalɪŋ]) is an Ortsgemeinde – a municipality belonging to a Verbandsgemeinde, a kind of collective municipality – in the Bernkastel-Wittlich district in Rhineland-Palatinate, Germany.

== Geography ==
The municipality lies some 20 km east of Trier and 8 km from the Mehring interchange on the Autobahn A 1. The municipality lies in the middle of the Hunsrück, whose highest elevation is the nearby Erbeskopf at 816 m above sea level. Talling belongs to the Verbandsgemeinde of Thalfang am Erbeskopf, whose seat is in the municipality of Thalfang.

== History ==
Beginning in 1112, Talling belonged to the Mark Thalfang, a territory roughly corresponding to today’s Verbandsgemeinde. After the French Revolution, the Rhine’s left bank, and thereby Talling too, were ceded to France in 1794 and 1795. Through a law from 26 March 1798, the French abolished feudal rights in their zone of occupation. To the Mayoralty (Mairie) of Talling belonged the villages of Berglicht, Gielert, Lückenburg, Neunkirchen and Schönberg. After French rule ended, the village passed in 1814 to the Kingdom of Prussia and shortly thereafter was assigned to the Amt of Thalfang. Since 1947, it has been part of the then newly founded state of Rhineland-Palatinate.

Partial traces of the old Roman road that led from Trier to Mainz can still be found in the surrounding woods. According to legend, the Schinderhannes Cave can also be found near the “Berrja Wacken”, a set of crags in the surrounding woods.

== Politics ==
=== Municipal council ===
The council is made up of 6 council members, who were elected by majority vote at the municipal election held on 7 June 2009, and the honorary mayor as chairman.

=== Coat of arms ===
The German blazon, as rendered in the approval document from the Regierungsbezirk administration of 14 December 1973, reads: Schild von Rot über Silber in erniedrigter Winkelteilung zum Schildfuß geteilt, oben in Rot eine silberne Eiche begleitet rechts unten von zwei goldenen Pflugmessern, links unten von einem goldenen Gemärke in G-Form.

The municipality’s arms might in English heraldic language be described thus: Gules an oak argent, in base dexter a pair of ploughshares palewise addorsed Or and in base sinister a stylized G, and a base per chevron reversed of the second.

The oak stands for forestry in Talling, as well as for the oaktree under monumental protection on Birkenallee. The stylized G stands for the traces of the former outlying centre of Gospert. The ploughshares symbolize agriculture, as does the base with the rather unusual line of partition.

== Culture and sightseeing ==
=== Clubs ===
There are two clubs in the municipality, the volunteer fire brigade and the Talling Table Tennis Club 1963.

The Stelzclub is a prominent volunteer youth association. It serves primarily as a social organization for young men, aiming to foster community life through volunteer and informal local initiatives.
