= Horath =

- Municipality
- Location of Horath within Bernkastel-Wittlich district
- Interactive map of Horath
- Location within Germany Location within Rhineland-Palatinate
- Coordinates: 49°48′41.70″N 06°59′9.48″E
- Country: Germany
- State: Rhineland-Palatinate
- District: Bernkastel-Wittlich
- Municipal assoc.: Thalfang am Erbeskopf

Government
  - Mayor (2020–24): Jan Steffes

Area
  - Total: 11.89 km^{2} (4.59 sq mi)
- Elevation: 440 m (1,440 ft)

Population (2025-12-31)
  - Total: 427
  - Density: 35.9/km^{2} (93.0/sq mi)
- Time zone: UTC+01:00 (CET)
  - Summer (DST): UTC+02:00 (CEST)
- Postal codes: 54497
- Dialling codes: 06504
- Vehicle registration: WIL

Horath is an Ortsgemeinde – a municipality belonging to a Verbandsgemeinde, a kind of collective municipality – in the Bernkastel-Wittlich district in Rhineland-Palatinate, Germany.

== Geography ==
=== Location ===
The municipality lies in the Hunsrück, in a hollow in the Dhron valley. Horath belongs to the Verbandsgemeinde of Thalfang am Erbeskopf, whose seat is in the municipality of Thalfang.

=== Neighbouring municipalities ===
Horath borders in the east on the municipality of Morbach (outlying centre of Haag), in the south on the municipalities of Merschbach and Gräfendhron, in the west on the municipalities of Berglicht and Neumagen-Dhron (outlying centre of Papiermühle) and in the north on the municipality of Piesport (outlying centre of Niederemmel).

== History ==
Local finds from Hallstatt and La Tène times are displayed at the Trier Rhenish State Museum. The village had its first documentary mention in a pledge document from Count Heinrich at Salm issued on 1 December 1281. As a result of the turmoil of the French Revolution, Horath lay under French rule beginning about 1800. In 1814 it was assigned to the Kingdom of Prussia at the Congress of Vienna. Since 1947, it has been part of the then newly founded state of Rhineland-Palatinate.

== Politics ==
=== Municipal council ===
The council is made up of 6 council members, who were elected by majority vote at the municipal election held on 7 June 2009, and the honorary mayor as chairman.

=== Coat of arms ===
The municipality's arms might be described thus: Argent a cross gules surmounted by a two-handled jug Or.

== Economy and infrastructure ==
Horath is a rural residential community. There are small businesses serving local demands.

=== Established businesses ===
In the Drahtwerk Horath (wireworks), however, Horath has an important industrial business as well.
