= Dhronecken =

- Municipality
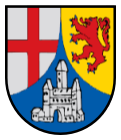
- Coat of arms

- Location of Dhronecken within Bernkastel-Wittlich district
- Interactive map of Dhronecken
- Location within Germany Location within Rhineland-Palatinate
- Coordinates: 49°43′32.88″N 06°58′55.73″E
- Country: Germany
- State: Rhineland-Palatinate
- District: Bernkastel-Wittlich
- Municipal assoc.: Thalfang am Erbeskopf

Government
  - Mayor (2019–24): Detlef Jochem

Area
  - Total: 1.45 km^{2} (0.56 sq mi)
- Elevation: 380 m (1,250 ft)

Population (2025-12-31)
  - Total: 126
  - Density: 86.9/km^{2} (225/sq mi)
- Time zone: UTC+01:00 (CET)
  - Summer (DST): UTC+02:00 (CEST)
- Postal codes: 54426
- Dialling codes: 06504
- Vehicle registration: WIL

Dhronecken is an Ortsgemeinde – a municipality belonging to a Verbandsgemeinde, a kind of collective municipality – in the Bernkastel-Wittlich district in Rhineland-Palatinate, Germany.

== Geography ==
Dhronecken lies between Trier and Saarbrücken, on the Hunsrückhöhenstraße (“Hunsrück Heights Road”, a scenic road across the Hunsrück built originally as a military road on Hermann Göring’s orders), 9 km from the Autobahn A 1 towards Morbach. In the Dhronecker Mulde (hollow), the Kleine Dhron forms where two brooks meet. This river flows down a dale to the small river Dhron, which then empties into the Moselle.

Dhronecken belongs to the Verbandsgemeinde of Thalfang am Erbeskopf, whose seat is in the municipality of Thalfang.

== History ==
=== Early times ===
Dhronecken lies in what is known to be the oldest tribal heartland of the Celts, whose lands, about 500 BC, stretched from the Middle Danube to Lorraine (Hallstatt culture), and who spread only in later centuries into what is now France. Burying grounds and, even more so, hill fortifications bear witness to those times. The Hunnenring – not far away, near Otzenhausen – is a mighty example.

=== Roman times ===
With Caesar’s victory over the Celtic tribes in 51 BC, the place that is now Dhronecken became part of a Roman province called Belgica Prima. In that time, a Roman sanctum came to be near Dhronecken. Also worth noting is the widespread settlement of Sarmatians between the Dhron and the Nahe, as they were non-Germanic people from the Russian steppes. With the Germanic migration period, the Roman occupation came to an end after many Celtic uprisings and the first Germanic invasions.

=== Frankish times ===
Then began the Franks’ rule. Their kings divided the land into Gaue (“regions” or “districts”; singular: Gau), putting Dhronecken into the Triergau and thereby under the Bishop of Trier, as confirmed about the year 800 by documents issued by the kings Pepin and Charlemagne.

=== Middle Ages to present ===
In the course of the Middle Ages, there was a splintering into smaller territories, and Troneck – as it was then known – became part of the Mark Thalfang (Talevangero marca). At the onset of the modern age, Troneck was the seat of the Waldgraves and the main town of the Mark Thalfang.

After the French Revolution, the Rhine’s left bank, and thereby Dhronecken too, were ceded to France in 1794 and 1795. Through a law from 26 March 1798, the French abolished feudal rights in their zone of occupation. After French rule ended, the village passed in 1814 to the Kingdom of Prussia.

Since 1947, it has been part of the then newly founded state of Rhineland-Palatinate.

=== Connection with the Nibelung saga ===
Dhronecken might be the hometown of the Nibelung hero Hagen von Tronje, as he is described in the foremost edition of the saga as “Hagen von Troneg” (with further examples in the dative case: von Tronege Hagene, geborn von Tronege, helt von Tronege, von Tronegaere). According to a multi-volume standard work of Germanic ancient history,

Research identifies Hagen’s origins, foremost, with the Castle Troneck in the Hunsrück, but also other places claim this, as certain (that is, solid) clues are missing. Now, in the year 752, a mediaeval document mentions for the first time the (river) Dhron as “Drona” (The Latin form “Drahonus” in Ausonius’s Mosella poem, late 4th century, is said to be unreliable), which together with the location at the forks, the corner (“corner” is Ecke in German) of two brooks, gave the mediaeval castle (Troneg/Troneck) its name. Possibly the writer of the Nibelungenlied, about the year 1200, believed that he had found the ancient-historical Hagen’s homeland in Troneck and places of the region (Hunoldispetra, Balderingin, Metz).

== Politics ==
The municipal council is made up of 6 council members, who were elected by majority vote at the municipal election held on 7 June 2009, and the honorary mayor as chairman.

== Culture and sightseeing ==
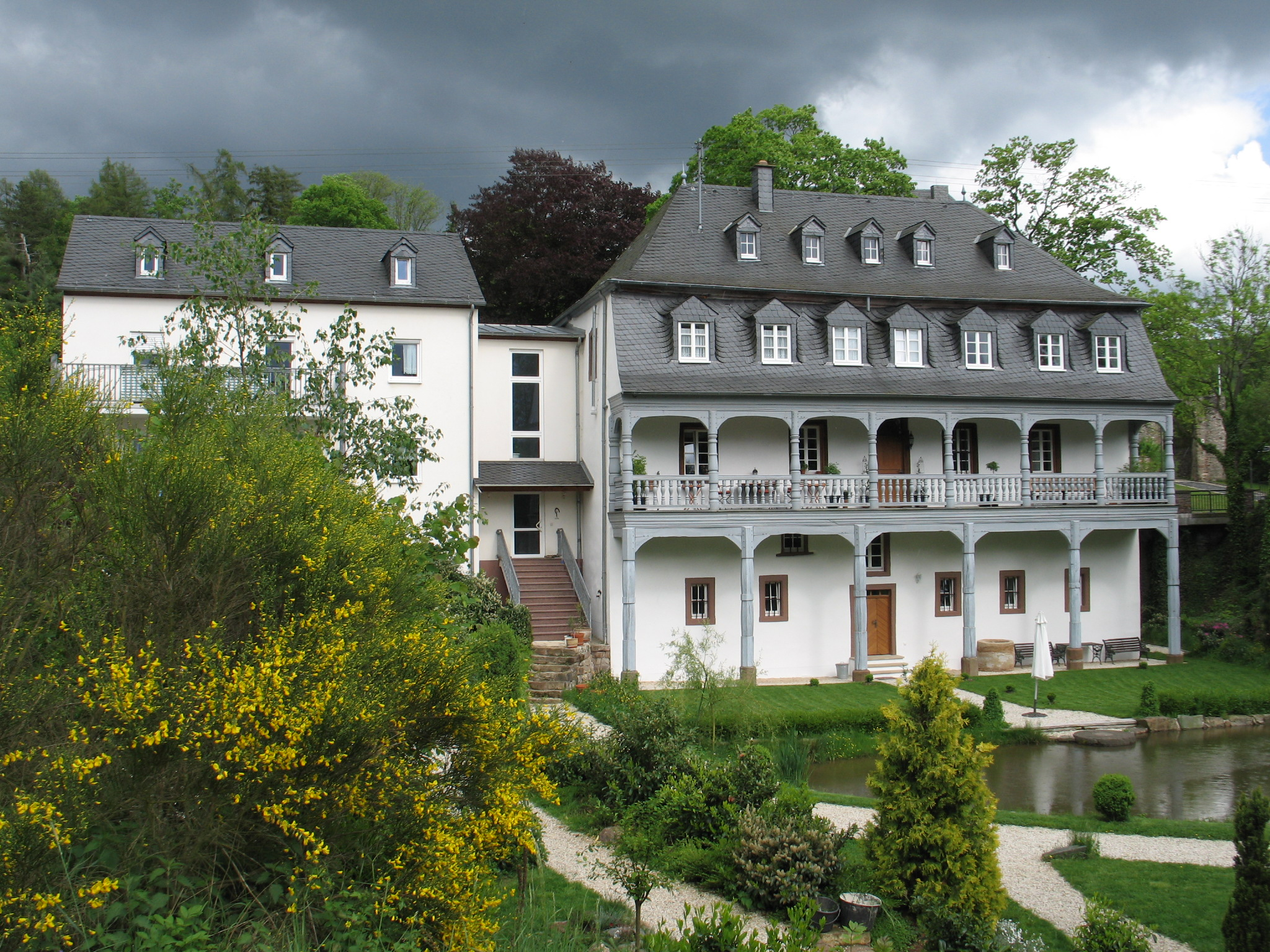
Heusner-Haus with balcony, built about 1700

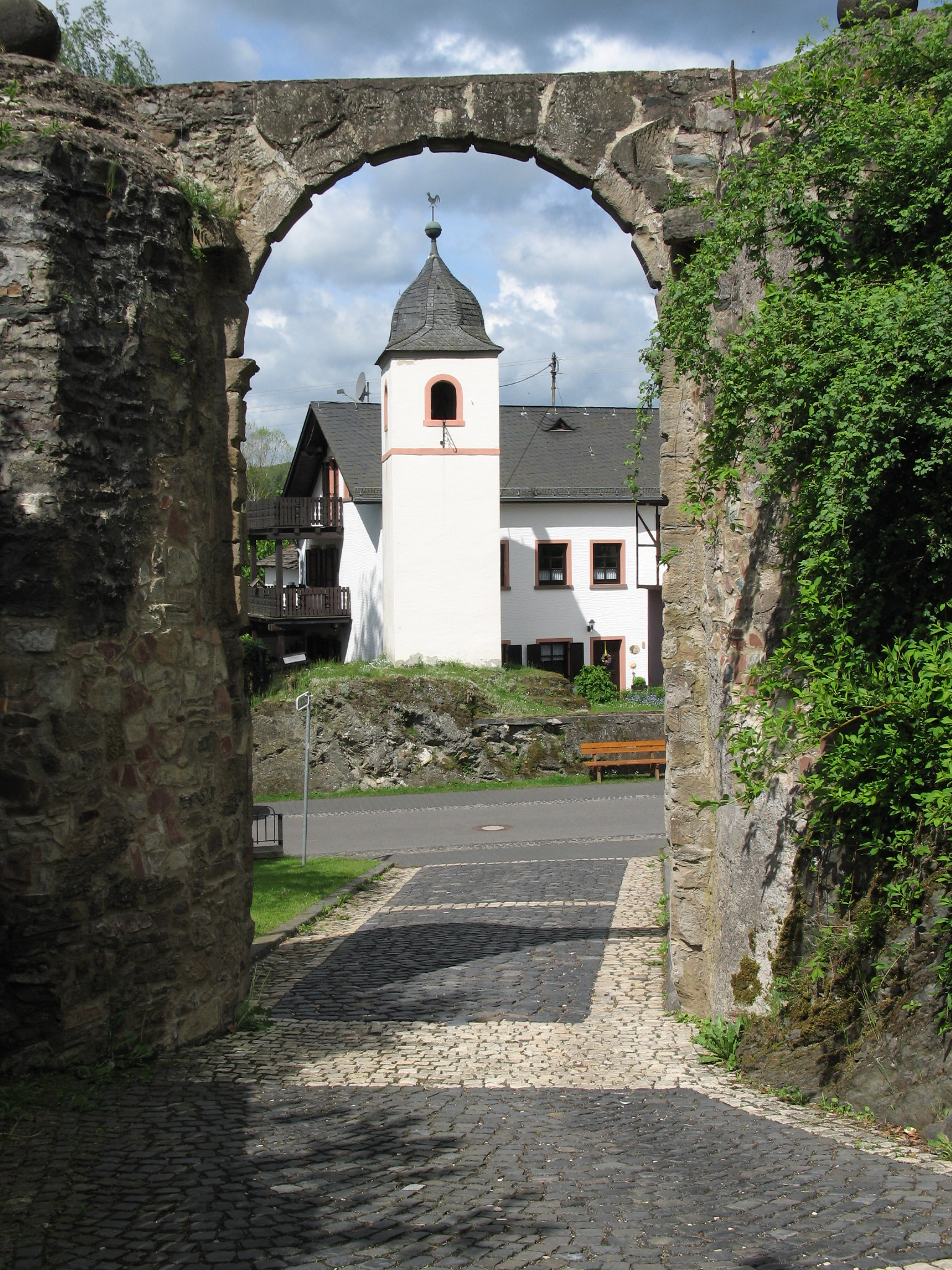
View out of the gateway of the Castle Dhronecken ruin of the municipality's belltower

=== Buildings ===
Burg Dhronecken About 1300, a knight named Conrad von Tronecken is mentioned in writing for the first time, and then somewhat later the Feste Troneck (fortification), which, however, is probably much older. Having been destroyed several times, by Cologne, Imperial and French troops, and then finally by an earthquake, only remnants are left now, although a corner tower can still be climbed.

On the old castle's foundations in modern times, commercial buildings were built, and also a bigger, tall building – called the Schloss – which is today used as a forester's office. Also, a barn with beam construction serves as a community centre for the municipality of Dhronecken. The attractively laid-out castle gardens have been continuously planted and tended since 1985.

Below the castle is a nature play area on both sides of a brook, featuring a ford with stepping stones; a forumlike playing and gathering place on a slope, made out of mighty stone blocks; wooden footbridges over wetlands left in their natural state; playing houses, a suspension bridge and a monorail.

Haus des wild- und rheingräflichen Verwalters der Burg Dhronecken The “House of the Wild- and Rhine-Comital Administrator of Castle Dhronecken” was, as shown by dendrological analysis, built in the Baroque style. It belonged to Castle Dhronecken's comital administrator, Friedrich Christian Heusner, who was at the same time an Amtmann and judge.

Since 1981 this house has been under monumental protection, thereby allowing it to be so well restored that from outside, it has regained its original appearance, and inside, in the Säulenhalle (“Hall of Columns”), the turned, four- to five-metre-tall oaken columns have been preserved.

What brings this house to the cultural-historical fore is its balcony made of turned oak logs and with oaken balustrades. The builder F. Ch. Heusner's family came from Franconia, where, having taken Italy as a model, balconies standing on columns were quite widespread. In the present, because most in Germany were wooden, only a very few have been saved from then. Besides Ulm ("3-Kannen-Anlage"), the balcony in Dhronecken could well be one of the biggest.

Decker Mühle A sawmill that is still functional today, the Decker Mühle was first mentioned, according to the Dhronecken chronicle, about 1750.

Watertower This was built about 1900.
