= Deuselbach =

- Municipality
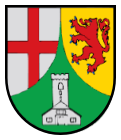
- Coat of arms

- Location of Deuselbach within Bernkastel-Wittlich district
- Interactive map of Deuselbach
- Location within Germany Location within Rhineland-Palatinate
- Coordinates: 49°45′08″N 7°3′02″E
- Country: Germany
- State: Rhineland-Palatinate
- District: Bernkastel-Wittlich
- Municipal assoc.: Thalfang am Erbeskopf

Government
  - Mayor (2019–24): Roland Schmidt

Area
  - Total: 4.03 km^{2} (1.56 sq mi)
- Elevation: 460 m (1,510 ft)

Population (2025-12-31)
  - Total: 283
  - Density: 70.2/km^{2} (182/sq mi)
- Time zone: UTC+01:00 (CET)
  - Summer (DST): UTC+02:00 (CEST)
- Postal codes: 54411
- Dialling codes: 06504
- Vehicle registration: WIL
- Website: www.deuselbach.de

Deuselbach is an Ortsgemeinde – a municipality belonging to a Verbandsgemeinde, a kind of collective municipality – in the Bernkastel-Wittlich district in Rhineland-Palatinate, Germany.

== Geography ==
=== Location ===
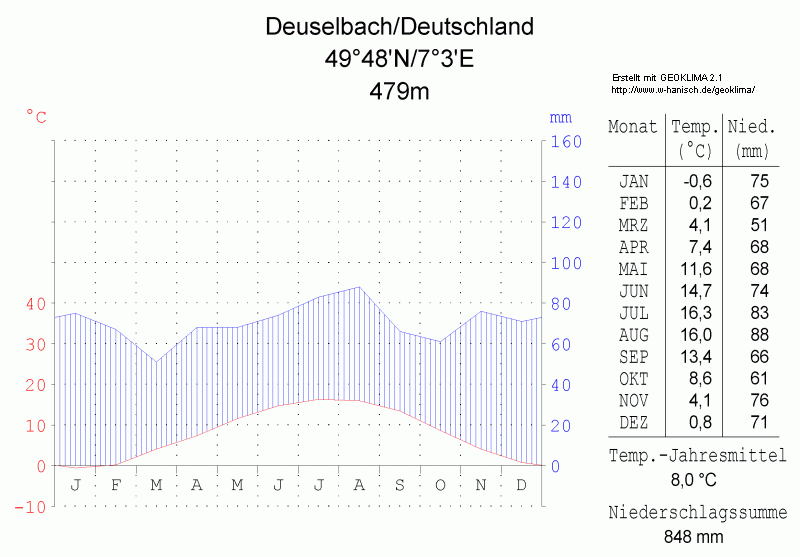
Climate diagram for Deuselbach

The municipality lies in the Hunsrück at the foot of the Erbeskopf. The nearest middle centres are Bernkastel-Kues and Morbach. Trier lies some 31 km away. Deuselbach belongs to the Verbandsgemeinde of Thalfang am Erbeskopf, whose seat is in the municipality of Thalfang.

=== Climate ===
The yearly mean temperature is 8 °C.

Climate data for Deuselbach (1991–2020 normals)
Month	Jan	Feb	Mar	Apr	May	Jun	Jul	Aug	Sep	Oct	Nov	Dec	Year
Mean daily maximum °C (°F)	3.4 (38.1)	4.5 (40.1)	8.6 (47.5)	13.3 (55.9)	17.0 (62.6)	20.4 (68.7)	23.1 (73.6)	22.2 (72.0)	17.9 (64.2)	12.7 (54.9)	7.6 (45.7)	4.2 (39.6)	12.9 (55.2)
Daily mean °C (°F)	0.9 (33.6)	1.5 (34.7)	4.7 (40.5)	8.7 (47.7)	12.4 (54.3)	15.6 (60.1)	17.7 (63.9)	17.4 (63.3)	13.4 (56.1)	9.3 (48.7)	5.0 (41.0)	2.0 (35.6)	9.1 (48.4)
Mean daily minimum °C (°F)	−1.2 (29.8)	−1.1 (30.0)	1.4 (34.5)	4.4 (39.9)	7.9 (46.2)	10.9 (51.6)	13.2 (55.8)	12.8 (55.0)	9.5 (49.1)	6.3 (43.3)	2.6 (36.7)	−0.2 (31.6)	5.5 (41.9)
Average precipitation mm (inches)	73.9 (2.91)	62.1 (2.44)	57.9 (2.28)	41.9 (1.65)	67.0 (2.64)	69.9 (2.75)	75.2 (2.96)	72.1 (2.84)	56.3 (2.22)	63.7 (2.51)	66.3 (2.61)	91.5 (3.60)	806.8 (31.76)
Average precipitation days (≥ 0.1 mm)	18.9	16.8	15.8	12.2	14.9	14.3	14.5	14.6	12.5	15.0	17.9	19.8	187.2
Average relative humidity (%)	88.2	84.1	76.9	70.3	72.8	73.2	70.6	73.1	77.2	84.3	88.6	89.2	78.0
Mean monthly sunshine hours	51.1	80.2	133.6	184.0	197.9	204.8	230.0	208.8	165.7	109.4	58.4	40.7	1,660.7
Source: NOAA

== History ==
In 1112, Deuselbach had its first documentary mention. After the French Revolution, the Rhine’s left bank, and thereby Deuselbach too, were ceded to France in 1794 and 1795. Through a law from 26 March 1798, the French abolished feudal rights in their zone of occupation. After French rule ended, the village passed in 1814 to the Kingdom of Prussia. Since 1947, it has been part of the then newly founded state of Rhineland-Palatinate. Until administrative reform in Rhineland-Palatinate in 1969, this village in the Hunsrück belonged to the Bernkastel district, whose seat was at Bernkastel-Kues. Today, Deuselbach is part of the Verbandsgemeinde of Thalfang am Erbeskopf.

== Politics ==
The municipal council is made up of 6 council members, who were elected by majority vote at the municipal election held on 7 June 2009, and the honorary mayor as chairman.

== Economy and infrastructure ==
In Deuselbach is found a German Weather Service weather station.
