= Schönberg, Rhineland-Palatinate =

Schönberg
- Municipality
- Coat of arms

- Location of Schönberg within Bernkastel-Wittlich district
- Interactive map of Schönberg
- Location within Germany Location within Rhineland-Palatinate
- Coordinates: 49°45′30″N 06°55′28″E
- Country: Germany
- State: Rhineland-Palatinate
- District: Bernkastel-Wittlich
- Municipal assoc.: Thalfang am Erbeskopf

Government
  - Mayor (2019–24): Harald Prümm

Area
  - Total: 5.1 km^{2} (2.0 sq mi)
- Elevation: 450 m (1,480 ft)

Population (2025-12-31)
  - Total: 241
  - Density: 47/km^{2} (120/sq mi)
- Time zone: UTC+01:00 (CET)
  - Summer (DST): UTC+02:00 (CEST)
- Postal codes: 54426
- Dialling codes: 06504
- Vehicle registration: WIL

Schönberg (German pronunciation: [ˈʃøːnbɛʁk]) is an Ortsgemeinde – a municipality belonging to a Verbandsgemeinde, a kind of collective municipality – in the Bernkastel-Wittlich district in Rhineland-Palatinate, Germany.

== Geography ==
Schönberg lies some 20 km east of Trier and 8 km from the Mehring interchange on the Autobahn A 1. Schönberg belongs to the Verbandsgemeinde of Thalfang am Erbeskopf, whose seat is in the municipality of Thalfang. The municipality lies in the middle of the Hunsrück, whose highest elevation is the Erbeskopf at 816 m above sea level. The Erbeskopf is roughly 6 km from the municipality as the crow flies. Flowing near Schönberg are the upper reaches of the river Kleine Dhron.

== History ==
Schönberg belonged to the Archbishopric of Trier. As a result of the turmoil of the French Revolution, Schönberg lay under French rule beginning about 1800. In 1814 it was assigned to the Kingdom of Prussia at the Congress of Vienna. Since 1947, it has been part of the then newly founded state of Rhineland-Palatinate.

== Politics ==
=== Municipal council ===
The council is made up of 6 council members, who were elected by majority vote at the municipal election held on 7 June 2009, and the honorary mayor as chairman.

=== Coat of arms ===
The municipality’s arms might be described thus: Gules an abbot’s staff palewise between two oakleaves, the one in dexter bendwise sinister and the one in sinister bendwise, all Or, in a base embowed towards chief of the second a menhir sable.

== Culture and sightseeing ==
=== Monoliths ===
Within municipal limits are found in two different spots upright menhirs.

North of the village, not far from the Büdlicherbrück-Talling road at the edge of the dale stands a menhir made out of a quartzite erratic block. The stone is 2.85 m tall, 1.35 m wide and 0.95 m thick. It tapers towards the top, albeit without coming to a point. The other such monolith is found near the electrical substation at the edge of Kreisstraße (District Road) 108 going towards Schönberg. This one is 2.85 m long, 1.30 m wide and 1.10 m thick. After grading work, the stone was put up again some 50 m north of where it had been found. It stands somewhat east of the substation near two benches.

== Economy and infrastructure ==
=== Infrastructure ===
Schönberg is a rural residential community. There are small businesses serving local demands.

=== Transport ===
Nearby runs the Hunsrückhöhenstraße (“Hunsrück Heights Road”, a scenic road across the Hunsrück built originally as a military road on Hermann Göring’s orders)
