= Neunkirchen, Bernkastel-Wittlich =

Neunkirchen
- Municipality
- Coat of arms

- Location of Neunkirchen within Bernkastel-Wittlich district
- Interactive map of Neunkirchen
- Location within Germany Location within Rhineland-Palatinate
- Coordinates: 49°45′03″N 6°56′32″E
- Country: Germany
- State: Rhineland-Palatinate
- District: Bernkastel-Wittlich
- Municipal assoc.: Thalfang am Erbeskopf

Government
  - Mayor (2019–24): Martin Jung

Area
  - Total: 3.16 km^{2} (1.22 sq mi)
- Elevation: 400 m (1,300 ft)

Population (2025-12-31)
  - Total: 157
  - Density: 49.7/km^{2} (129/sq mi)
- Time zone: UTC+01:00 (CET)
  - Summer (DST): UTC+02:00 (CEST)
- Postal codes: 54426
- Dialling codes: 06504
- Vehicle registration: WIL

Neunkirchen (German: [ˈnɔʏnkɪʁçn̩]) is an Ortsgemeinde – a municipality belonging to a Verbandsgemeinde, a kind of collective municipality – in the Bernkastel-Wittlich district in Rhineland-Palatinate, Germany.

== Geography ==
The municipality lies in the Hunsrück and belongs to the Verbandsgemeinde of Thalfang am Erbeskopf, whose seat is in the municipality of Thalfang.

== History ==
As a result of the turmoil of the French Revolution, Neunkirchen lay under French rule beginning about 1800. In 1814 it was assigned to the Kingdom of Prussia at the Congress of Vienna. Since 1947, it has been part of the then newly founded state of Rhineland-Palatinate.

== Politics ==
=== Municipal council ===
The council is made up of 6 council members, who were elected by majority vote at the municipal election held on 7 June 2009, and the honorary mayor as chairman.

=== Mayor ===
The Mayor of Neunkirchen is Martin Jung.

== Economy and infrastructure ==
Neunkirchen is a rural residential community. There are small businesses serving local demands.
