= Heidenburg =

- Municipality
- Coat of arms

- Location of Heidenburg within Bernkastel-Wittlich district
- Interactive map of Heidenburg
- Location within Germany Location within Rhineland-Palatinate
- Coordinates: 49°47′56″N 6°55′05″E
- Country: Germany
- State: Rhineland-Palatinate
- District: Bernkastel-Wittlich
- Municipal assoc.: Thalfang am Erbeskopf

Government
  - Mayor (2023–24): Dieter Mattes

Area
  - Total: 9.49 km^{2} (3.66 sq mi)
- Elevation: 400 m (1,300 ft)

Population (2025-12-31)
  - Total: 701
  - Density: 73.9/km^{2} (191/sq mi)
- Time zone: UTC+01:00 (CET)
  - Summer (DST): UTC+02:00 (CEST)
- Postal codes: 54426
- Dialling codes: 06509
- Vehicle registration: WIL
- Website: www.heidenburg.de

Heidenburg (German pronunciation: [ˈhaɪdn̩bʊʁk]) is an Ortsgemeinde – a municipality belonging to a Verbandsgemeinde, a kind of collective municipality – in the Bernkastel-Wittlich district in Rhineland-Palatinate, Germany.

== Geography ==
=== Location ===
The municipality lies in the Hunsrück south of the bow in the Moselle between Leiwen and Trittenheim. Between Heidenburg and the Moselle is the valley of the Kleine Dhron, a deep cut in the landscape. Not far downstream, the Kleine Dhron feeds the Dhron reservoir.

Heidenburg belongs to the Verbandsgemeinde of Thalfang am Erbeskopf, whose seat is in the municipality of Thalfang.

== History ==
In 1053, Heidenburg had its first documentary mention. As a result of the turmoil of the French Revolution, Heidenburg lay under French rule beginning about 1800. In 1814 it was assigned to the Kingdom of Prussia at the Congress of Vienna. Since 1947, it has been part of the then newly founded state of Rhineland-Palatinate. Since administrative reform in Rhineland-Palatinate in 1969, the municipality has belonged to the Verbandsgemeinde of Thalfang am Erbeskopf. In 1997, Heidenburg was awarded the title “Child- and Family-Friendly Municipality, National Winner” (Bundessieger Kinder- und Familienfreundliche Gemeinde).

== Politics ==
=== Municipal council ===
The council is made up of 12 council members, who were elected by proportional representation at the municipal election held on 26 May 2019, and the honorary mayor as chairman.

The municipal election held on 26 May 2019 yielded the following results:

	SPD	CDU	FWG	group	Total
2019	multi-member plurality voting				12 seats
2014	3	4	2	3	12 seats
2009	7	3	2	–	12 seats
2004	5	4	3	–	12 seats
1999	6	4	2	–	12 seats

=== Mayor ===
The mayor (Ortsbürgermeister) is Dieter Mattes.

=== Coat of arms ===
The German blazon reads: Schild von eingebogener Spitze, darin ein goldener Pflug mit silberner Flugschar, gespalten, vorne in Silber ein rotes Balkenkreuz, hinten in Silber zwei grüne Heidekrautstengel mit roten Blüten.

The municipality's arms might in English heraldic language be described thus: Tierced in mantle, dexter argent a cross gules, sinister argent two heath sprigs vert conjoined in base and with flowers gules, in base vert a plough Or with ploughshare of the first.

The German blazon does not mention the field tincture in the base division, although it is shown as vert (green) at the Verbandsgemeinde website

The arms have been borne since 1988 when they were approved by the Regierungsbezirk administration.

=== Town partnerships ===
Heidenburg fosters partnerships with the following places:

- Villeblevin, Yonne, France

== Economy and infrastructure ==
Heidenburg is a rural residential community. There are small businesses serving local demands.
