= Johannes Greber =

German priest and translator (1876–1944)

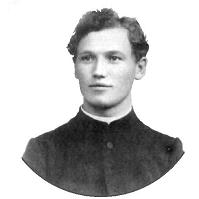
- Portrait of Johannes Greber as a Catholic priest

Member of the Reichstag
- In office January 1918 – November 1918
- Constituency: Koblenz 3

Personal details
- Born: May 2, 1874 Wenigerath, Rhine Province, German Empire
- Died: March 31, 1944 (aged 69) Teaneck, New Jersey, U.S.
- Party: Centre Party
- Children: 2
- Occupation: Catholic priest (former); spiritualist; translator; politician
- Known for: Communication with the Spirit World of God (1932); New Testament translation (1935/1937)

Johannes Greber (2 May 1874 – 31 March 1944) was a German Catholic priest and short-term Centre Party Reichstag deputy who later became a Christian spiritualist author and Bible translator.

== Life ==
Greber was born in Wenigerath. He was ordained in 1900 and served a church in the poor area of Hunsrueck. Many in the area suffered from tuberculosis, even ‘’organizing nurses to treat large numbers of tuberculosis’’. During WW1, he also helped thousands of children escape the war by fleeing into Holland.

From January 1918 to November 1918 he was member of German Reichstag for the Centre Party.

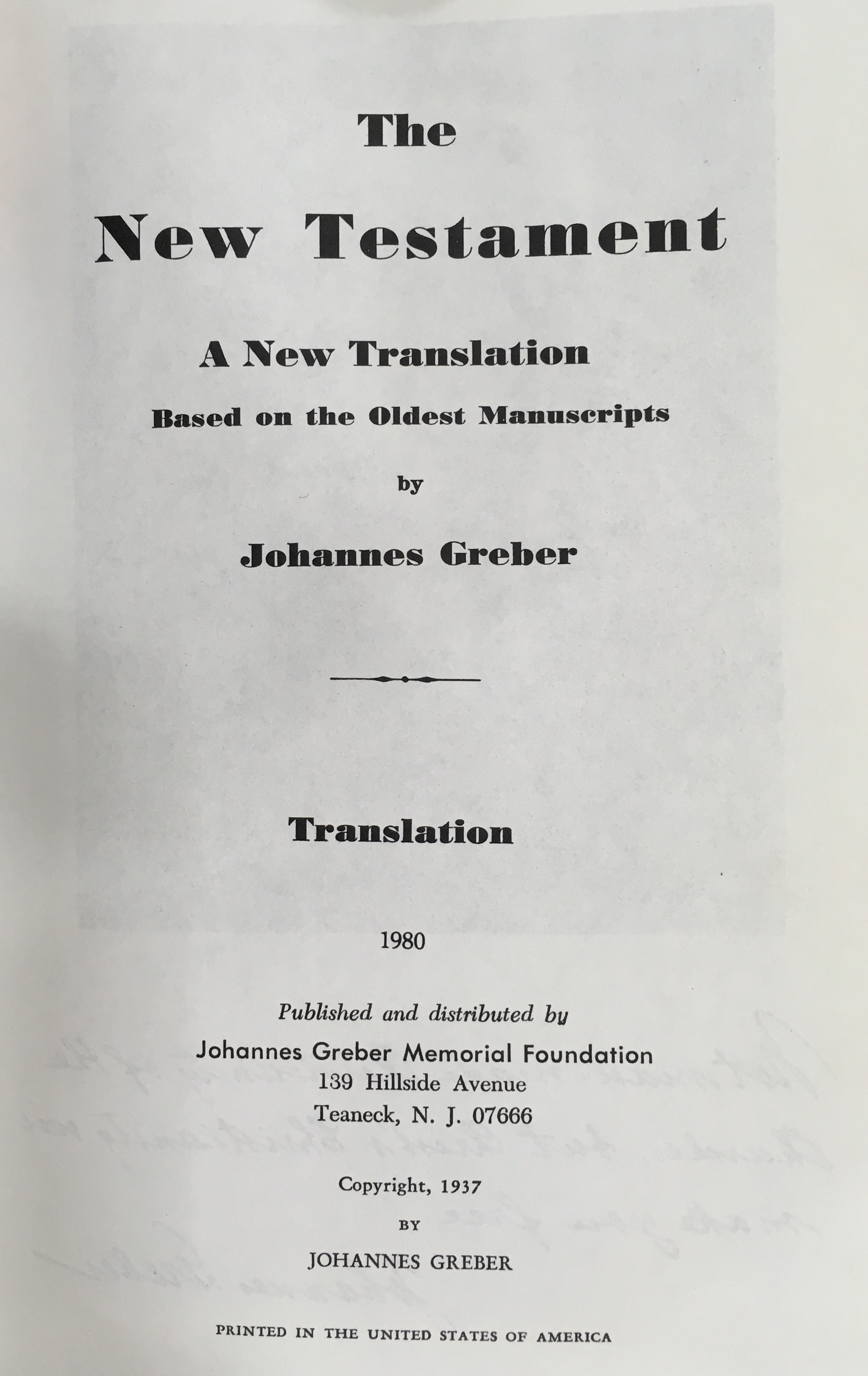
Title page of Greber's New Testament

In 1923, he attended a séance and his life was changed. He renounced his vows and left the Catholic church. He emigrated to the USA in 1929 and began a nondenominational church, with prayer and healing sessions in Teaneck, NJ. He later worked on a translation of the New Testament, publishing ‘’The New Testament, A New Translation and Explanation Based on the Oldest Manuscripts’’ (1935). He claimed using the oldest sources available including the Greek codex D. Where a meaning was not clear, according to his prologue, he received supernatural guidance as he translated, after much time in prayer, with his wife acting as a medium, and with visions of the actual words given to him on occasion. “In the rare instances in which a text pronounced correct by the divine spirits can be found in none of the manuscripts available today, I have the text as given by the spirits.”

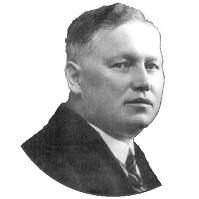
Portrait of Gerber after his emigration

Greber's belief in spirit communication with holy spirits of God, which he portrayed as a common occurrence throughout the Old and New Testament, clearly affected his translation. For example, 1 Corinthians 12:28 is translated as “...mediums who speak in various foreign languages’’.”

In a small number of 1950s and 1960s articles the Watch Tower Society referred approvingly to Gerber's rendering of John 1:1 (Note: German: Im Anfang war das Wort, und das Wort war bei Gott; und ein 'Gott' war das Wort., lit. 'In the beginning was the Word, and the Word was with God; and a 'god' was the Word.') and Matthew 27:51–53. (Note: German: Da zerriss der Vorhang im Tempel von oben bis unten in zwei Stücke, die Erde erbebte und die Felsen zersprangen. Die Grabkammern wurden offen gelegt und viele Leichen der Entschlafenen empor gerichtet. In ihrer aufrechten Stellung ragten sie aus den Grabkammern heraus und wurden von vielen gesehen, die dort auf dem Rückwege zur Stadt vorüberkamen., lit. 'Then the curtain in the temple was torn from top to bottom into two pieces, the earth quaked, and the rocks split. The burial chambers were laid open, and many corpses of the sleepers were set upright. In their upright position they stuck out from the burial chambers and were seen by many who were passing by there on the way back to the city.') They later ceased citing him on account of his occult connections.

== Publications ==
- Communication with the Spirit World of God, Its Laws and Purpose (1932)
- A Plan for the Solution of the Problem of the German Refugees (1939)
- New Testament, A New Translation Based on the Oldest Manuscripts (1935)
