= Malborn =

- Municipality
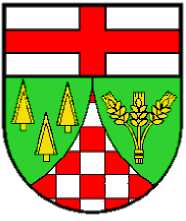
- Coat of arms

- Location of Malborn within Bernkastel-Wittlich district
- Interactive map of Malborn
- Location within Germany Location within Rhineland-Palatinate
- Coordinates: 49°42′59″N 6°59′16″E
- Country: Germany
- State: Rhineland-Palatinate
- District: Bernkastel-Wittlich
- Municipal assoc.: Thalfang am Erbeskopf

Government
  - Mayor (2019–24): Petra-Claudia Hogh

Area
  - Total: 26.31 km^{2} (10.16 sq mi)
- Elevation: 500 m (1,600 ft)

Population (2025-12-31)
  - Total: 1,376
  - Density: 52.30/km^{2} (135.5/sq mi)
- Time zone: UTC+01:00 (CET)
  - Summer (DST): UTC+02:00 (CEST)
- Postal codes: 54426
- Dialling codes: 06503, 06504
- Vehicle registration: WIL
- Website: www.malborn-thiergarten.de

Malborn is an Ortsgemeinde – a municipality belonging to a Verbandsgemeinde, a kind of collective municipality – in the Bernkastel-Wittlich district in Rhineland-Palatinate, Germany.

== Geography ==
=== Location ===
The municipality lies in the Hunsrück. The municipal area covers 26.3 km², of which 18.4 km² is wooded. Malborn lies at the foot of the Steinkopf (683 m above sea level), on which stood a lookout tower until 2018. Due to the lack of money, it was unfortunately demolished and has not been rebuilt to this day.

Near Malborn rises the river Prims, which is dammed up in the Primstalsperre (reservoir), and which empties into the Saar near Dillingen.

Malborn belongs to the Verbandsgemeinde of Thalfang am Erbeskopf, whose seat is in the municipality of Thalfang.

=== Constituent communities ===
Malborn's Ortsteile are the main centre, also called Malborn, and the outlying centre of Thiergarten.

== History ==
In 981, Malborn had its first documentary mention. As a result of the turmoil of the French Revolution, Malborn lay under French rule beginning about 1800. In 1814 it was assigned to the Kingdom of Prussia at the Congress of Vienna. Since 1947, it has been part of the then newly founded state of Rhineland-Palatinate.

== Politics ==
=== Municipal council ===
The council is made up of 16 council members, who were elected by proportional representation at the municipal election held on 7 June 2009, and the honorary mayor as chairwoman. The municipal election held on 7 June 2009 yielded the following results:

	CDU	WG Lauer	Total
2009	10	6	16 seats
2004	9	7	16 seats

=== Coat of arms ===
The municipality's arms might be described thus: Tierced in mantle, dexter vert three fir trees Or, sinister vert three ears of wheat banded in base and couped of the second, and the base chequy argent and gules, in a chief of the third a cross of the last.

The tinctures argent and gules (silver and red) recall two of the municipality's historical allegiances: the cross in the chief is a reference to the villages’ former allegiance to the Electorate of Trier, while the “chequy” pattern refers to the Counts of Sponheim. The fields in the tinctures vert and Or (green and gold) refer to the municipality's historical livelihood in forestry, with its considerable woodlands symbolized on the dexter (armsbearer's right, viewer's left) side by the three stylized trees, and agriculture, symbolized on the sinister (armsbearer's left, viewer's right) side by the three ears of wheat.
