= Burtscheid, Rhineland-Palatinate =

Burtscheid
- Municipality
- Coat of arms

- Location of Burtscheid within Bernkastel-Wittlich district
- Interactive map of Burtscheid
- Location within Germany Location within Rhineland-Palatinate
- Coordinates: 49°43′55.41″N 06°57′26.90″E
- Country: Germany
- State: Rhineland-Palatinate
- District: Bernkastel-Wittlich
- Municipal assoc.: Thalfang am Erbeskopf

Government
  - Mayor (2019–24): Sebastian Graul

Area
  - Total: 2.99 km^{2} (1.15 sq mi)
- Elevation: 470 m (1,540 ft)

Population (2025-12-31)
  - Total: 117
  - Density: 39.1/km^{2} (101/sq mi)
- Time zone: UTC+01:00 (CET)
  - Summer (DST): UTC+02:00 (CEST)
- Postal codes: 54424
- Dialling codes: 06504
- Vehicle registration: WIL

Burtscheid is an Ortsgemeinde – a municipality belonging to a Verbandsgemeinde, a kind of collective municipality – in the Bernkastel-Wittlich district in Rhineland-Palatinate, Germany.

== Geography ==
The municipality lies in the Hunsrück and belongs to the Verbandsgemeinde of Thalfang am Erbeskopf, whose seat is in the municipality of Thalfang.

== History ==
The name Burtscheid is a Germanized form of the Celtic Bor(uo)cetum, with the components Borvo, meaning “warm spring”, and also a god's name (see also Worms, Wormerich and the French Bourbon), and caito-, ceto-, meaning “forest” (Breton koat, koet; Welsh coed – “forest”).

In the Middle Ages, Burtscheid belonged to the Mark Thalfang whose seat was at Schloss Dhronecken (castle). After the French Revolution, the Rhine’s left bank, and thereby Burtscheid too, were ceded to France in 1794 and 1795. Through a law from 26 March 1798, the French abolished feudal rights in their zone of occupation. After French rule ended, the village passed in 1814 to the Kingdom of Prussia. Since 1947, it has been part of the then newly founded state of Rhineland-Palatinate.

== Politics ==
The municipal council is made up of 6 council members, who were elected by majority vote at the municipal election held on 7 June 2009, and the honorary mayor as chairman.
