= Gielert =

- Municipality
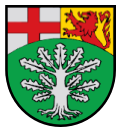
- Coat of arms

- Location of Gielert within Bernkastel-Wittlich district
- Interactive map of Gielert
- Location within Germany Location within Rhineland-Palatinate
- Coordinates: 49°46′28.44″N 07°00′9.52″E
- Country: Germany
- State: Rhineland-Palatinate
- District: Bernkastel-Wittlich
- Municipal assoc.: Thalfang am Erbeskopf

Government
  - Mayor (2023–24): Jannick Jungbluth

Area
  - Total: 4.09 km^{2} (1.58 sq mi)
- Elevation: 500 m (1,600 ft)

Population (2025-12-31)
  - Total: 130
  - Density: 32/km^{2} (82/sq mi)
- Time zone: UTC+01:00 (CET)
  - Summer (DST): UTC+02:00 (CEST)
- Postal codes: 54424
- Dialling codes: 06504
- Vehicle registration: WIL

Gielert is an Ortsgemeinde – a municipality belonging to a Verbandsgemeinde, a kind of collective municipality – in the Bernkastel-Wittlich district in Rhineland-Palatinate, Germany.

== Geography ==
Gielert belongs to the Verbandsgemeinde of Thalfang am Erbeskopf, whose seat is in the municipality of Thalfang.

== History ==
Beginning in the 12th century, Gielert was part of the Mark Thalfang, a territory roughly corresponding to today's Verbandsgemeinde. As a result of the turmoil of the French Revolution, Gielert lay under French rule beginning about 1800. In 1814 it was assigned to the Kingdom of Prussia at the Congress of Vienna. Since 1947, it has been part of the then newly founded state of Rhineland-Palatinate. Until administrative reform in Rhineland-Palatinate in 1969, the municipality belonged to the Bernkastel district, whose seat was at Bernkastel-Kues. Today Gielert is part of the Verbandsgemeinde of Thalfang am Erbeskopf.

== Politics ==
=== Municipal council ===
The council is made up of 6 council members, who were elected by majority vote at the municipal election held on 26 May 2019, and the honorary mayor as chairman.

=== Coat of arms ===
The municipality's arms might be described thus: Vert an oak eradicated argent, in a chief embowed party per pale argent a cross gules and Or a lion rampant of the third couped at the hip by the line of partition, armed and langued azure.

== Culture and sightseeing ==
=== Natural monuments ===
- Old Huteiche (“Hat Oak”) in Gielert

=== Clubs ===
- Sport club FC Gielert

== Economy and infrastructure ==
Gielert is a rural residential community. There are small businesses serving local demands.
