= Rorodt =

- Municipality
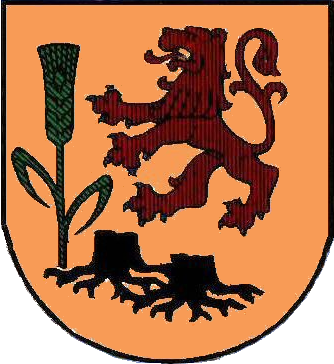
- Coat of arms

- Location of Rorodt within Bernkastel-Wittlich district
- Interactive map of Rorodt
- Location within Germany Location within Rhineland-Palatinate
- Coordinates: 49°46′11″N 7°03′04″E
- Country: Germany
- State: Rhineland-Palatinate
- District: Bernkastel-Wittlich
- Municipal assoc.: Thalfang am Erbeskopf

Government
  - Mayor (2021–24): Sascha Kropp

Area
  - Total: 3.41 km^{2} (1.32 sq mi)
- Elevation: 400 m (1,300 ft)

Population (2025-12-31)
  - Total: 56
  - Density: 16/km^{2} (43/sq mi)
- Time zone: UTC+01:00 (CET)
  - Summer (DST): UTC+02:00 (CEST)
- Postal codes: 54411
- Dialling codes: 06504
- Vehicle registration: WIL
- Website: www.rorodt.de

Rorodt is an Ortsgemeinde – a municipality belonging to a Verbandsgemeinde, a kind of collective municipality – in the Bernkastel-Wittlich district in Rhineland-Palatinate, Germany.

== Geography ==
The municipality lies in the Hunsrück and belongs to the Verbandsgemeinde of Thalfang am Erbeskopf, whose seat is in the municipality of Thalfang.

== History ==
In 1136, Rorodt had its first documentary mention as Roveroth. Rorodt belonged until Secularization to the Archbishopric of Trier and was part of the Mark Thalfang, a territory roughly corresponding to today's Verbandsgemeinde. After French rule ended, the village passed in 1814 to the Kingdom of Prussia. Since 1947, it has been part of the then newly founded state of Rhineland-Palatinate.

== Politics ==
The municipal council is made up of 6 council members (who were elected by majority vote proportional representation at the municipal election held on 7 June 2009) with the honorary mayor as chairman.
