= Breit =

- Municipality
- Coat of arms

- Location of Breit within Bernkastel-Wittlich district
- Interactive map of Breit
- Location within Germany Location within Rhineland-Palatinate
- Coordinates: 49°46′33.52″N 06°54′20.85″E
- Country: Germany
- State: Rhineland-Palatinate
- District: Bernkastel-Wittlich
- Municipal assoc.: Thalfang am Erbeskopf

Government
  - Mayor (2019–24): Christine Paulußen

Area
  - Total: 4 km^{2} (1.5 sq mi)
- Elevation: 400 m (1,300 ft)

Population (2025-12-31)
  - Total: 332
  - Density: 83/km^{2} (210/sq mi)
- Time zone: UTC+01:00 (CET)
  - Summer (DST): UTC+02:00 (CEST)
- Postal codes: 54426
- Dialling codes: 06509
- Vehicle registration: WIL
- Website: www.og-breit.de

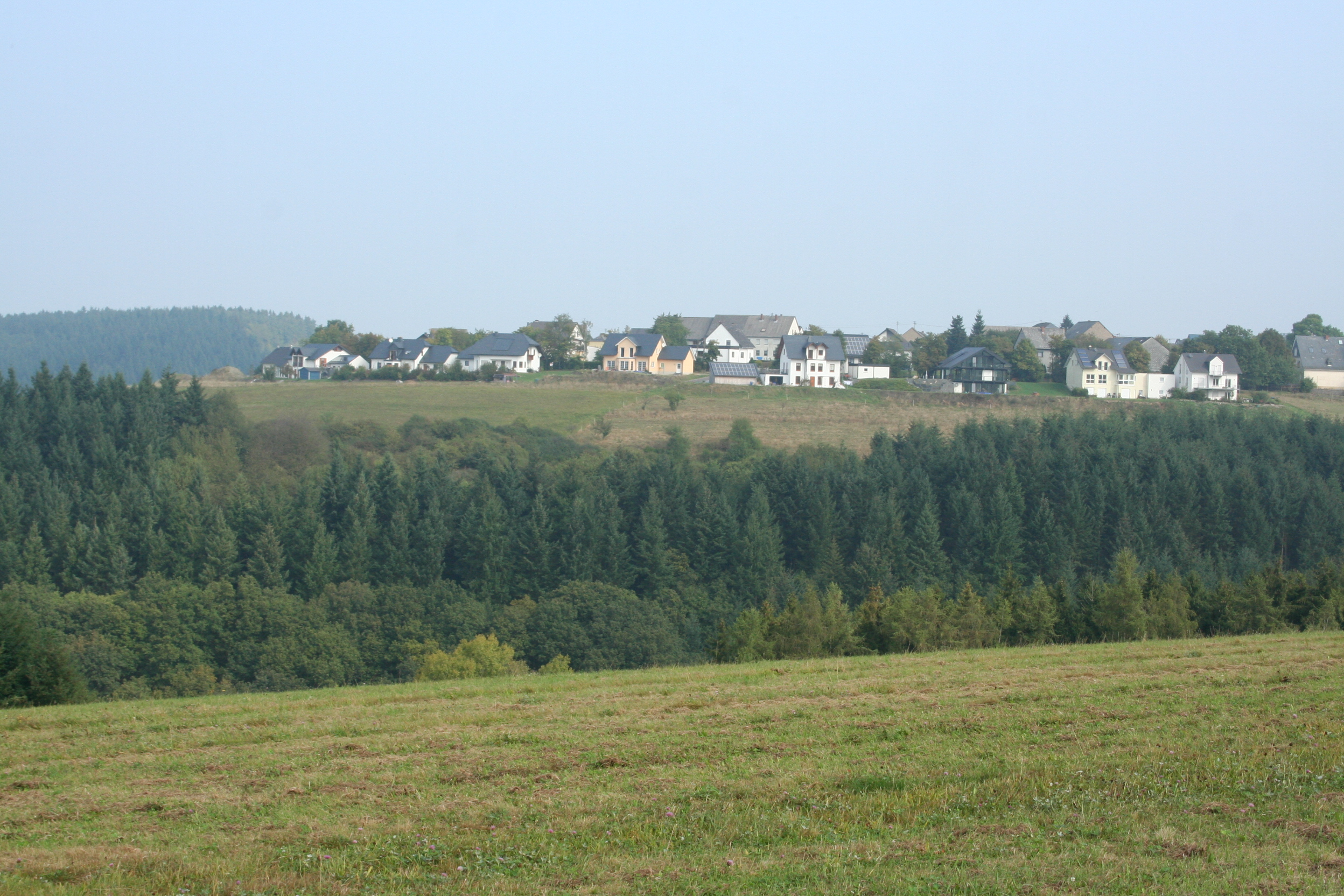
Breit

Breit (German pronunciation: [bʁaɪt]) is an Ortsgemeinde – a municipality belonging to a Verbandsgemeinde, a kind of collective municipality – in the Bernkastel-Wittlich district in Rhineland-Palatinate, Germany.

== Geography ==
The municipality lies in the Hunsrück on a knoll about 400 m above sea level and thereby some 150 m above the bottom of the Kleine Dhron river valley. Breit belongs to the Verbandsgemeinde of Thalfang am Erbeskopf, whose seat is in the municipality of Thalfang.

== History ==
In the early 13th century, Breit had its first documentary mention in the name “Conrad von Breit” in a record from St. Maximin’s Abbey. After the French Revolution, the Rhine’s left bank, and along with it Breit, were ceded to France in 1794 and 1795. Through a law from 26 March 1798, the French abolished feudal rights in their zone of occupation. After French rule ended, the village passed in 1814 to the Kingdom of Prussia. Since 1947, it has been part of the then newly founded state of Rhineland-Palatinate. Since administrative reform in Rhineland-Palatinate in 1969, Breit has belonged to the Verbandsgemeinde of Thalfang am Erbeskopf in the Bernkastel-Wittlich district. Formerly it had been part of the Amt of Klüsserath, which in the course of the administrative reform was abolished.

== Politics ==
=== Municipal council ===
The council is made up of 6 council members, who were elected by majority vote at the municipal election held on 7 June 2009, and the honorary mayor as chairman.

=== Mayor ===
The mayor is Christine Paulußen.

=== Coat of arms ===
The municipality’s arms might be described thus: Tierced in mantle, dexter argent a cross gules, sinister argent an oak eradicated vert, and in base a bicapitated eagle’s head(s) erased Or langued of the second.

== Culture and sightseeing ==
In Breit stands the Kugelbaum, a roughly 200-year-old oak. The local sport club is FC Büdlich-Breit-Naurath. Moreover, there are a music club, a church choir, a theatre club and the promotional association of the Breit volunteer fire brigade.

Running by Breit is the Via Ausonia (or Ausoniusweg in German), a hiking trail – formerly a Roman road – leading from Trier to Bingen am Rhein and named after the Roman poet and state official Decimus Magnus Ausonius, who between AD 365 and 368 travelled in the area and described it.

== Economy and infrastructure ==
=== Transport ===
A long-distance transport link is provided by the Mehring Autobahn interchange (A 1) some 8 km away. The nearest railway station is the main station in Trier, 25 km from Breit. Breit is structured as a Haufendorf, or “clustered village”.
