= Immert =

- Municipality
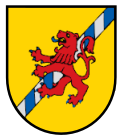
- Coat of arms

- Location of Immert within Bernkastel-Wittlich district
- Interactive map of Immert
- Location within Germany Location within Rhineland-Palatinate
- Coordinates: 49°45′55″N 7°01′13″E
- Country: Germany
- State: Rhineland-Palatinate
- District: Bernkastel-Wittlich
- Municipal assoc.: Thalfang am Erbeskopf

Government
  - Mayor (2019–24): Marco Wagner

Area
  - Total: 3.14 km^{2} (1.21 sq mi)
- Elevation: 470 m (1,540 ft)

Population (2025-12-31)
  - Total: 164
  - Density: 52.2/km^{2} (135/sq mi)
- Time zone: UTC+01:00 (CET)
  - Summer (DST): UTC+02:00 (CEST)
- Postal codes: 54426
- Dialling codes: 06504
- Vehicle registration: WIL

Immert is an Ortsgemeinde – a municipality belonging to a Verbandsgemeinde, a kind of collective municipality – in the Bernkastel-Wittlich district in Rhineland-Palatinate, Germany.

== Geography ==
The municipality lies in the Hunsrück and belongs to the Verbandsgemeinde of Thalfang am Erbeskopf, whose seat is in the municipality of Thalfang.

== History ==
Beginning in the 12th century, Immert was part of the Mark Thalfang, a territory roughly corresponding to today's Verbandsgemeinde. As a result of the turmoil of the French Revolution, Immert lay under French rule beginning about 1800. In 1814 it was assigned to the Kingdom of Prussia at the Congress of Vienna. Since 1947, it has been part of the then newly founded state of Rhineland-Palatinate.

== Politics ==
=== Municipal council ===
The council is made up of 6 council members, who were elected by majority vote at the municipal election held on 7 June 2009, and the honorary mayor as chairman.

=== Coat of arms ===
The municipality's arms might be described thus: Or a bendlet sinister bendy argent and azure surmounted by a lion rampant gules armed and langued of the third.
