= Etgert =

- Municipality
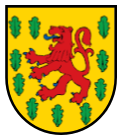
- Coat of arms

- Location of Etgert within Bernkastel-Wittlich district
- Interactive map of Etgert
- Location within Germany Location within Rhineland-Palatinate
- Coordinates: 49°46′46″N 7°01′19″E
- Country: Germany
- State: Rhineland-Palatinate
- District: Bernkastel-Wittlich
- Municipal assoc.: Thalfang am Erbeskopf

Government
  - Mayor (2019–24): Sabrina Kirch

Area
  - Total: 3.75 km^{2} (1.45 sq mi)
- Elevation: 445 m (1,460 ft)

Population (2025-12-31)
  - Total: 67
  - Density: 18/km^{2} (46/sq mi)
- Time zone: UTC+01:00 (CET)
  - Summer (DST): UTC+02:00 (CEST)
- Postal codes: 54424
- Dialling codes: 06504
- Vehicle registration: WIL

Etgert is an Ortsgemeinde – a municipality belonging to a Verbandsgemeinde, a kind of collective municipality – in the Bernkastel-Wittlich district in Rhineland-Palatinate, Germany.

== Geography ==
The municipality lies in the Hunsrück and belongs to the Verbandsgemeinde of Thalfang am Erbeskopf, whose seat is in the municipality of Thalfang.

== History ==
Beginning in the 12th century, Etgert was part of the Mark Thalfang, a territory roughly corresponding to today's Verbandsgemeinde. As a result of the turmoil of the French Revolution, Etgert lay under French rule beginning about 1800. In 1814 it was assigned to the Kingdom of Prussia at the Congress of Vienna. Since 1947, it has been part of the then newly founded state of Rhineland-Palatinate. Until administrative reform in Rhineland-Palatinate in 1969, the municipality belonged to the Bernkastel district, whose seat was at Bernkastel-Kues. Today Etgert is part of the Verbandsgemeinde of Thalfang am Erbeskopf.

== Politics ==
=== Municipal council ===
The council is made up of 6 council members, who were elected by majority vote at the municipal election held on 7 June 2009, and the honorary mayor as chairman.

=== Coat of arms ===
The municipality's arms might be described thus: Or semée of oakleaves vert a lion rampant gules armed and langued azure.

== Economy and infrastructure ==
Etgert is a rural residential community. There are small businesses serving local demands.
