= Thalfang am Erbeskopf =

German administrative region

- Verbandsgemeinde
- Location of Thalfang am Erbeskopf within Bernkastel-Wittlich district
- Interactive map of Thalfang am Erbeskopf
- Location within Germany Location within Rhineland-Palatinate
- Coordinates: 49°45′N 7°00′E
- Country: Germany
- State: Rhineland-Palatinate
- District: Bernkastel-Wittlich
- Seat: Thalfang
- Subdivisions: 21 municipalities

Area
  - Total: 144.64 km^{2} (55.85 sq mi)

Population (2025-12-31)
  - Total: 7,489
  - Density: 51.78/km^{2} (134.1/sq mi)
- Time zone: UTC+01:00 (CET)
  - Summer (DST): UTC+02:00 (CEST)
- Website: www.erbeskopf.de

Thalfang am Erbeskopf is a verbandsgemeinde ("collective municipality") in the district Bernkastel-Wittlich, in Rhineland-Palatinate, Germany. Its administrative seat is Thalfang. The Erbeskopf is also located there.

The Verbandsgemeinde Thalfang am Erbeskopf consists of the following Ortsgemeinden ("local municipalities"):

1. Berglicht
2. Breit
3. Büdlich
4. Burtscheid
5. Deuselbach
6. Dhronecken
7. Etgert
8. Gielert
9. Gräfendhron
10. Heidenburg
11. Hilscheid
12. Horath
13. Immert
14. Lückenburg
15. Malborn
16. Merschbach
17. Neunkirchen
18. Rorodt
19. Schönberg
20. Talling
21. Thalfang
