= Erbeskopf =

Mountain in southwest Germany

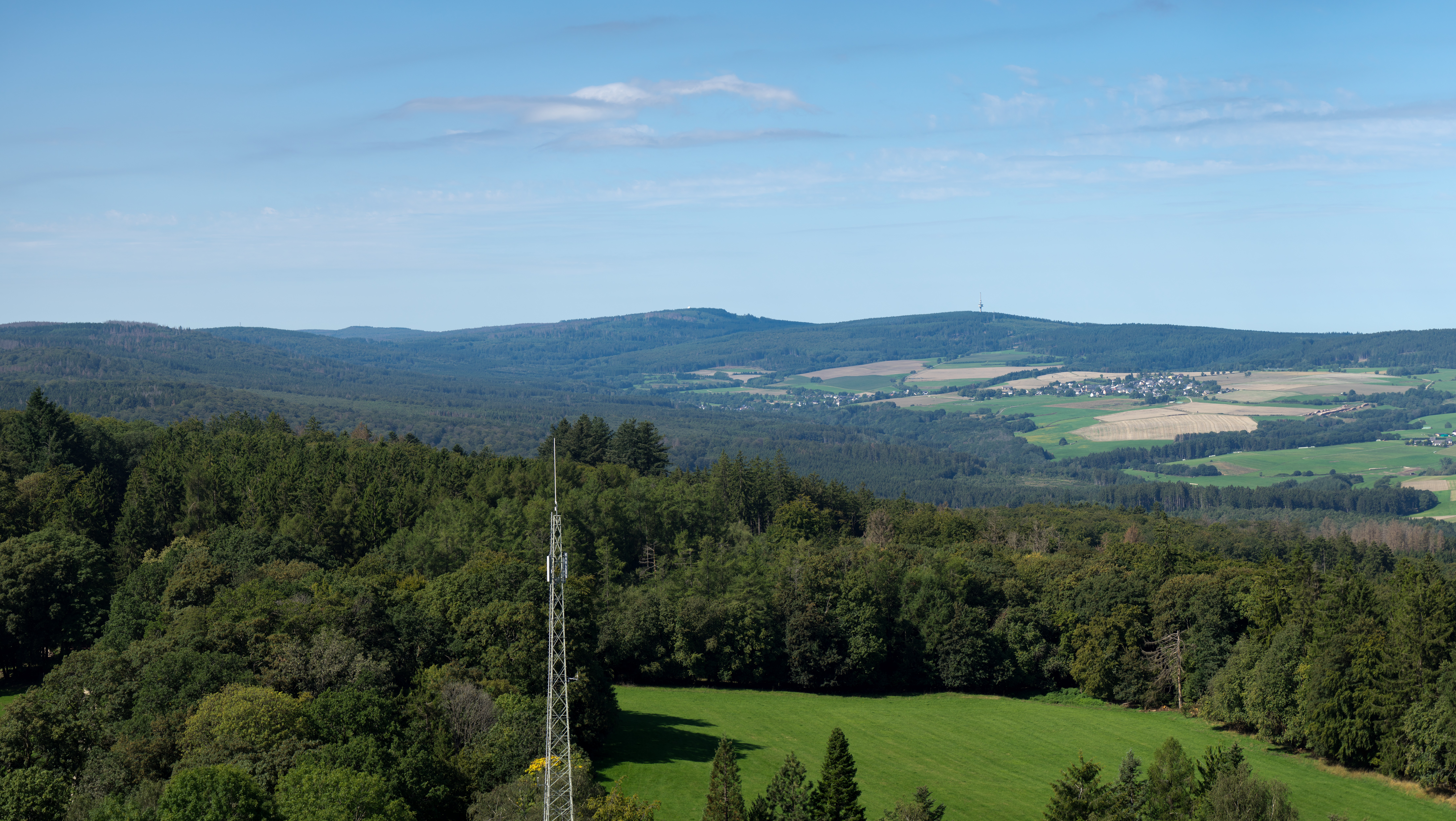
- Erbeskopf from the northeast (Wildenburg Castle)

Highest point
- Elevation: 816.32 m above sea level (NHN) (2,678.2 ft)
- Prominence: 571 m ↓ Bruchhof, Homburg
- Isolation: 113 km → Großer Feldberg
- Listing: The highest mountain in the Hunsrück and in Rhineland-Palatinate
- Coordinates: 49°43′50″N 7°05′26″E

Geography
- Location within Rhineland-Palatinate
- Location: Counties of Bernkastel-Wittlich and Birkenfeld; Rhineland-Palatinate, Germany
- Parent range: Hunsrück

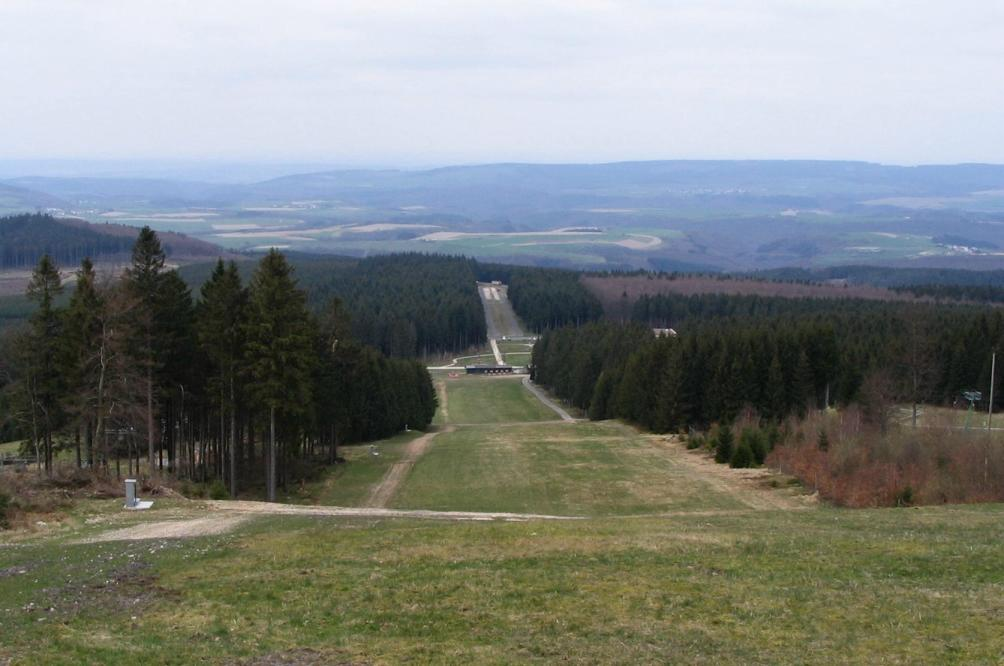
On the Erbeskopf

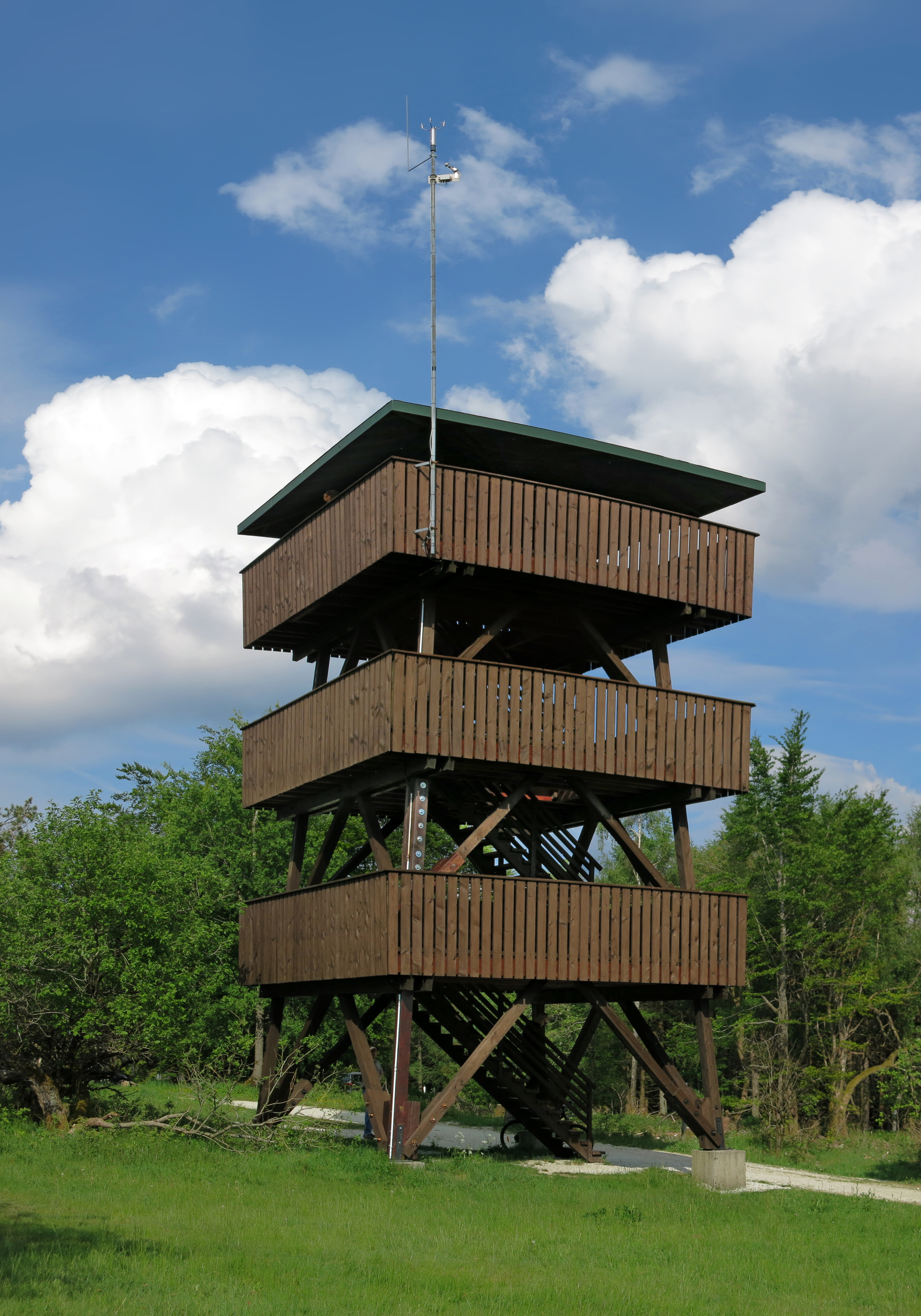
Erbeskopf Tower

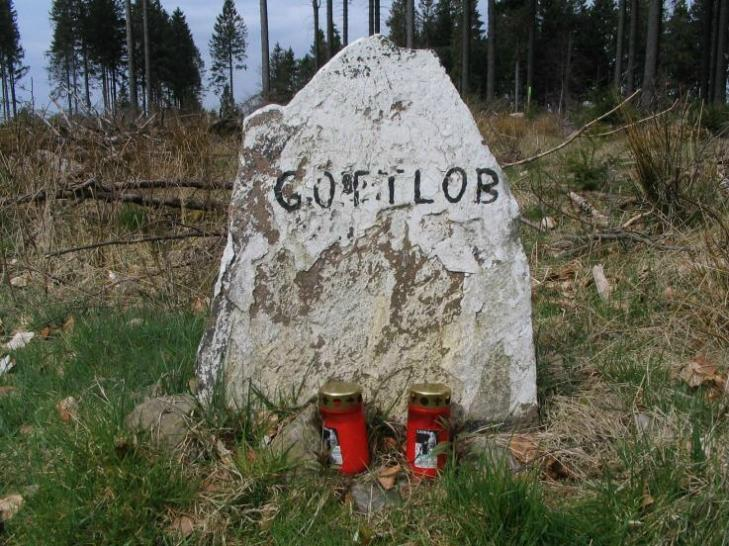
Gottlob Stone

The Erbeskopf (German pronunciation) is a mountain in the Hunsrück range in central Germany. At a height of 816 metres (2,677 ft), it is the highest point in the state of Rhineland-Palatinate, as well as the highest point of German territory on the western bank of the Rhine. It lies within the Saar-Hunsrück Nature Park.

== Geography ==
=== Location ===
The Erbeskopf lies in the southwest of the Hunsrück and the Idar Forest - forming part of both natural regions - near their boundary with the Schwarzwälder Hochwald, to which it belongs morphologically. Its largest part and the summit are part of the municipality of Hilscheid in the county of Bernkastel-Wittlich. The rest belongs to Allenbach in the county of Birkenfeld. Its northeasterly neighbour, also in the Idar Forest, is the Kahlheid (766.0 m).

The streams that rise near on the Erbeskopf are: the Idarbach whose source lies to the northeast below the subpeak of Sandkopf and thus south of the Kahlheid; the Thranenbach, the upper course of the Traunbach, whose source is southeast of the summit; the Hohltriefbach, whose source lies below the subpeak of Springenkopf and is a tributary of the Röderbach which rises northwest of the Erbeskopf; and the Simm to the north, a tributary of the Schalesbach.

=== Elevation ===
In 2008 a re-survey of the height of the Erbeskopf was conducted by the Rhineland-Palatinate State Office of Survey and Geobasis Information (Landesamt für Vermessung und Geobasisinformation Rheinland-Pfalz); using two independent survey measurements that each gave a height of 816.32 m.

Its subpeaks, with their heights in metres (m) above sea level (Normalhöhennull or NHN), are:

- Sandkopf (802.0 m), ca. 0.6 km northeast of the Erbeskopf
- Springenkopf (784.2 m), ca. 1.7 km southwest of the Erbeskopf
- Viehauskopf (720.7 m), ca. 1.3 km southwest of the Springenkopf
- Hohltriefberg (680.6 m), ca. 0.8 km southwest of the Viehausberg

== History ==
During a military exercise in 1892, sappers built a wooden observation tower on the mountain. In 1894, the Society for the Moselle, Hochwald and Hunsrück (today the Hunsrück Club) decided to construct a stone Emperor William Tower at the summit. This 24-metre-high tower was opened in 1901, 111 steps leading up to a viewing platform. In 1933 a kiosk was built at the entrance to the tower and a weather station installed at the top.

In late August 1939 the tower was closed to civilians, three more storeys were added, military signals equipment was installed and it acted as the communication centre for a radio relay link from Berlin to the Atlantic coast. The weather station was upgraded.

US troops occupied the Erbeskopf on 17 March 1945. They expanded its military facilities considerably and observed all military air traffic well into the territory of the Soviet Union. Three large radar towers and the Erwin Bunker with the wartime headquarters for Central Europe (AFCENT) supported NATO strategy as a multinational command post during the Cold War. The Emperor William Tower was blown up on 18 August 1961 because it obstructed the all-round military radar picture.

In 1971 the 11-metre-high, wooden Erbeskopf Observation Tower or "Erbeskopf Tower" (Erbeskopfturm) was built outside the out-of-bounds area. The tower is of wooden design with three platforms. Although its views are now restricted by trees, in places there are good views as far as the Eifel.

In the wake of the political easing of tension between NATO and the so-called Eastern Bloc states the significance of the listening equipment and electronic alarm systems on the Erbeskopf waned rapidly. Half a century after the end of the Second World War, American troops withdrew and the radar site continued in operation by the Bundeswehr.

Until August 2004 the summit plateau was a heavily fenced-off, military out-of-bounds area. Since the removal of the barbed wire, most of the summit is now open to the public again.

For centuries the Erbeskopf was crowned by a grove of mighty beech trees at the summit. In former times it was also called the Heiliger Hain ("Holy Copse"), although it is not recorded whether it had been a heathen site or Christian shrine. After the Emperor William Tower was blown up and widescale clearing took place, there were only a few remnants to give a poor impression of the original ancient trees.

== Today ==
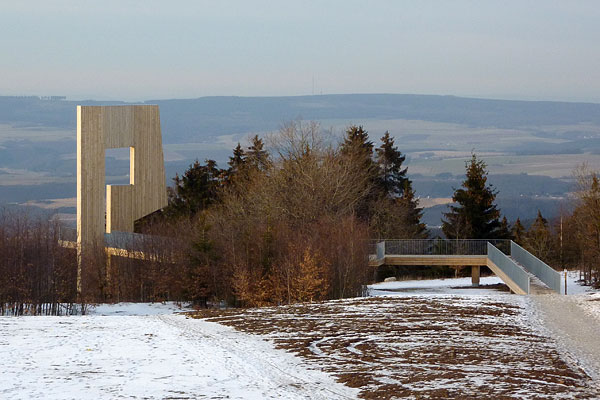
Windklang

In 2011 the summit plateau was extensively remodelled. The so-called "conversion project", initiated by a special purpose association, the "Erbeskopf Winter Sports, Nature and Environmental Training Site" (Wintersport-, Natur- und Umweltbildungsstätte Erbeskopf), after the military had handed back part of the area, cost €800,000, of which €554,000 was pledged by the state. The sculptor, Christoph Mancke, in cooperation with landscape architects, Ernst+Partner of Trier, won the preceding competition for the "Use and Design of the Erbeskopf Summit" in a field of 29 participants. The sculpture, which may be walked on, was called Windklang ("Wind Tone") by Mancke and offers not just an outstanding view towards the northern side of the valley (the ski piste), but is also itself visible as a landmark from a long way off. Landscape architects, Ernst+Partner, built another, ground-level object, "Summits of the Region" (Gipfelköpfe der Region), on the plateau, that points to other mountains in the region using concrete axes indicating their direction, height and distance.

On the Erbeskopf there is a leisure and winter sports centre. Three ski lifts operate in the winter and a sommerrodelbahn in the warmer months. In the winter of 2005/2006, the lifts were open for a record 88 days. The ski piste is used in summer as part of the Erbeskopf Mountain Bike Marathon. Since 2007 the Saar-Hunsrück-Steig long-distance path has included the Erbeskopf within the leg from Börfink to Morbach.

The Hunsrückhaus at the northwest foot of the mountain is well known nationally as an environmental training centre. It offers an interactive exhibition on the nature of the Hunsrück, a woodland play park, a senses educational path, a weather survey garden, an environmental laboratory and a conference centre with modern media technology.

A footpath used to run from the Mark Thalfang into Birkenfelder Land. At the highest point of the way, very close to the summit of the Erbeskopf travellers would stop to say a prayer. This is still commemorated by a stone inscribed with the word Gottlob ("Praise to God").

On 29 April 2012 a "sculpture path" was opened on the newly remodelled summit plateau. The six additional works of art were displayed until 15 September 2012.

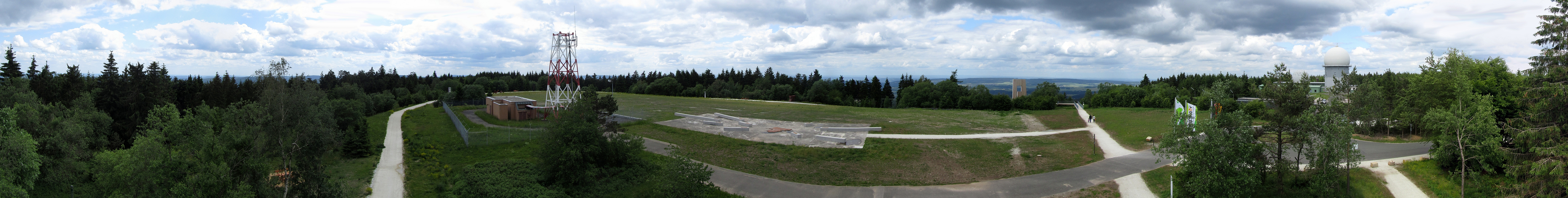
View from the observation tower over the summit plateau
