= Hilscheid =

- Municipality
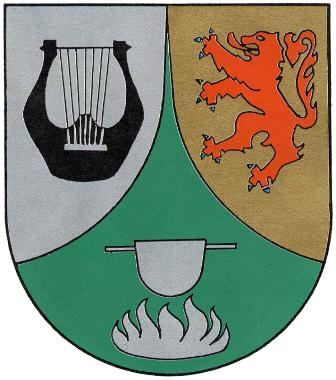
- Coat of arms

- Location of Hilscheid within Bernkastel-Wittlich district
- Interactive map of Hilscheid
- Location within Germany Location within Rhineland-Palatinate
- Coordinates: 49°43′54.15″N 07°00′20.7″E
- Country: Germany
- State: Rhineland-Palatinate
- District: Bernkastel-Wittlich
- Municipal assoc.: Thalfang am Erbeskopf

Government
  - Mayor (2019–24): Heiko Ennulat

Area
  - Total: 18.07 km^{2} (6.98 sq mi)
- Elevation: 460 m (1,510 ft)

Population (2025-12-31)
  - Total: 270
  - Density: 15/km^{2} (39/sq mi)
- Time zone: UTC+01:00 (CET)
  - Summer (DST): UTC+02:00 (CEST)
- Postal codes: 54426
- Dialling codes: 06504
- Vehicle registration: WIL
- Website: hilscheid.de

Hilscheid is an Ortsgemeinde – a municipality belonging to a Verbandsgemeinde, a kind of collective municipality – in the Bernkastel-Wittlich district in Rhineland-Palatinate, Germany.

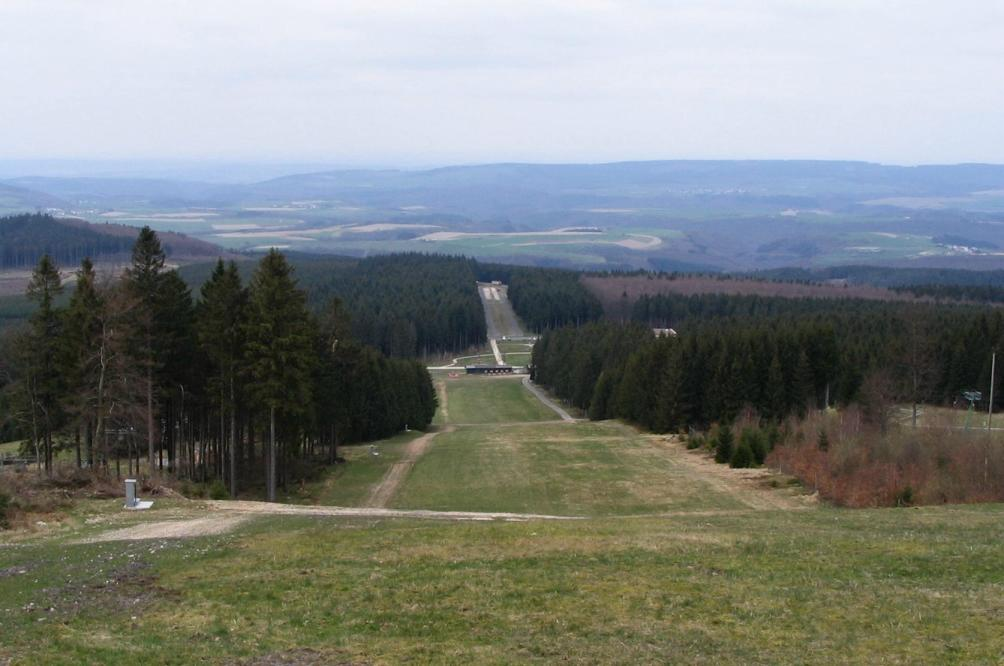
View from the Erbeskopf

== Geography ==
The municipality lies in the Hunsrück and within its municipal area is the Erbeskopf. Of the municipal area's 1 807 ha, 1 434 ha is wooded. Hilscheid belongs to the Verbandsgemeinde of Thalfang am Erbeskopf, whose seat is in the municipality of Thalfang.

== History ==
Beginning in the 12th century, Hilscheid was part of the Mark Thalfang, a territory roughly corresponding to today's Verbandsgemeinde. As a result of the turmoil of the French Revolution, Hilscheid lay under French rule beginning about 1800. In 1814 it was assigned to the Kingdom of Prussia at the Congress of Vienna. Since 1947, it has been part of the then newly founded state of Rhineland-Palatinate.

== Politics ==
=== Municipal council ===
The council is made up of 6 council members, who were elected by majority vote at the municipal election held on 7 June 2009, and the honorary mayor as chairman.

=== Coat of arms ===
The German blazon reads: Schild von eingebogener grüner Spitze, darin eine silberne Schmelzpfanne über silbernen Flammen, gespalten; vorn in silbern eine schwarze Lyra, hinten in Gold ein blaubewehrter roter Löwe.

The municipality's arms might in English heraldic language be described thus: Tierced in mantle, dexter argent a lyre sable, sinister Or a lion rampant gules armed azure, and in base vert a melting pan over fire of the first.

The lyre is meant to express the municipality's connection with music. The red lion is a charge formerly borne by the Waldgraves and Rhinegraves. The charges in base, the fire and melting pan, stand for the former Röderbach Iron Foundry, which stood within Hilscheid's limits.

The arms have been borne since 23 January 1986.

== Economy and infrastructure ==
Hilscheid is a rural residential community with several agricultural businesses.

=== Transport ===
Hillscheid is served by the local busses of the line 465 and located in the area of the transport association Verkehrsverbund Rhein-Mosel (VRM).

There also was a branch line of the Engers-Au railway heading to Grenzau, but it is out of service and partly deconstructed.
