= Lückenburg =

- Municipality
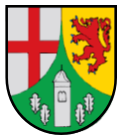
- Coat of arms

- Location of Lückenburg within Bernkastel-Wittlich district
- Interactive map of Lückenburg
- Location within Germany Location within Rhineland-Palatinate
- Coordinates: 49°44′36″N 6°57′56″E
- Country: Germany
- State: Rhineland-Palatinate
- District: Bernkastel-Wittlich
- Municipal assoc.: Thalfang am Erbeskopf

Government
  - Mayor (2019–24): Stefan Thömmes

Area
  - Total: 2.57 km^{2} (0.99 sq mi)
- Elevation: 486 m (1,594 ft)

Population (2025-12-31)
  - Total: 97
  - Density: 38/km^{2} (98/sq mi)
- Time zone: UTC+01:00 (CET)
  - Summer (DST): UTC+02:00 (CEST)
- Postal codes: 54424
- Dialling codes: 06504
- Vehicle registration: WIL
- Website: www.lueckenburg.de

Lückenburg (German pronunciation: [ˈlʏkn̩bʊʁk]) is an Ortsgemeinde – a municipality belonging to a Verbandsgemeinde, a kind of collective municipality – in the Bernkastel-Wittlich district in Rhineland-Palatinate, Germany.

== Geography ==
The municipality lies in the Hunsrück and belongs to the Verbandsgemeinde of Thalfang am Erbeskopf, whose seat is in the municipality of Thalfang.

== History ==
In 1274, Lückenburg had its first documentary mention as Licechenburg. As a result of the turmoil of the French Revolution, Lückenburg lay under French rule beginning about 1800. In 1814 it was assigned to the Kingdom of Prussia at the Congress of Vienna. Since 1947, it has been part of the then newly founded state of Rhineland-Palatinate.

Until municipal administrative reform in Rhineland-Palatinate in 1969, the municipality belonged to the Bernkastel district with its seat in Bernkastel-Kues. Today Lückenburg is part of the Verbandsgemeinde of Thalfang am Erbeskopf.

== Politics ==
=== Municipal council ===
The council is made up of 6 council members, who were elected by majority vote at the municipal election held on 7 June 2009, and the honorary mayor as chairman.

=== Coat of arms ===
The German blazon reads: Schild von eingebogener grüner Spitze, darin ein silberner Turm, rechts und links von je zwei silbernen Eichenblättern begleitet, gespalten; vorn in Silber ein rotes Balkenkreuz, hinten in Gold ein blaubewehrter roter Löwe.

The municipality's arms might in English heraldic language be described thus: Tierced in mantle, dexter argent a cross gules, sinister Or a lion rampant of the second armed azure, in base vert a tower of the first between four oakleaves palewise of the same, those in dexter in bend and those in sinister in bend sinister.

The two charges on the sides of the “mantle” are historical references. The cross on the dexter (armsbearer's right, viewer's left) side is from Electoral Trier's old arms, and the lion rampant on the sinister (armsbearer's left, viewer's right) side from those borne by the Waldgraves and Rhinegraves. The tower in base, however, is a village landmark.

== Famous people ==
=== Sons and daughters of the town ===
- Heinz Renner (1892–1964), politician (KPD)
