= Büdlich =

- Municipality
- Location of Büdlich within Bernkastel-Wittlich district
- Interactive map of Büdlich
- Location within Germany Location within Rhineland-Palatinate
- Coordinates: 49°46′53.44″N 06°54′13.2″E
- Country: Germany
- State: Rhineland-Palatinate
- District: Bernkastel-Wittlich
- Municipal assoc.: Thalfang am Erbeskopf

Government
  - Mayor (2019–24): Jörg Schönenberger

Area
  - Total: 4.02 km^{2} (1.55 sq mi)
- Elevation: 290 m (950 ft)

Population (2025-12-31)
  - Total: 212
  - Density: 52.7/km^{2} (137/sq mi)
- Time zone: UTC+01:00 (CET)
  - Summer (DST): UTC+02:00 (CEST)
- Postal codes: 54426
- Dialling codes: 06509
- Vehicle registration: WIL

Büdlich is an Ortsgemeinde – a municipality belonging to a Verbandsgemeinde, a kind of collective municipality – in the Bernkastel-Wittlich district in Rhineland-Palatinate, Germany.

== Geography ==
=== Location ===
The municipality, one of the district's smaller ones, lies in the Hunsrück. It belongs to the Verbandsgemeinde of Thalfang am Erbeskopf, whose seat is in the municipality of Thalfang.

=== Constituent communities ===
Büdlich's Ortsteile are Büdlich and Büdlicherbrück.

== History ==
After the French Revolution, the Rhine’s left bank, and thereby Büdlich too, were ceded to France. Through a law from 26 March 1798, the French abolished feudal rights in their zone of occupation. After French rule ended, the village passed in 1814 to the Kingdom of Prussia. North of Büdlich, the Dhron Valley Dam (Dhrontalsperre) was built in 1911. Since 1947, it has been part of the then newly founded state of Rhineland-Palatinate.

== Politics ==
=== Municipal council ===
The municipal council is made up of 6 council members, who were elected by majority vote at the municipal election held on 7 June 2009, and the honorary mayor as chairwoman.

=== Mayor ===
The mayor (Ortsbürgermeister) is Jörg Schönenberger.

=== Coat of arms ===
The municipality's arms might be described thus: Per pall reversed, dexter argent a cross gules, sinister Or a ploughshare palewise sable, the point to base, and in base vert an oakleaf palewise of the third, conjoining the base field at the cusp a tower embattled of three of the same with a window of the fourth.

== Culture and sightseeing ==
- Menhir of Büdlich between Büdlich and Heidenburg
- Burgkopf

== Economy and infrastructure ==
Büdlich is a rural residential community. There are small businesses serving local demands.
