= Gräfendhron =

- Municipality
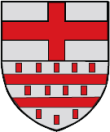
- Coat of arms

- Location of Gräfendhron within Bernkastel-Wittlich district
- Interactive map of Gräfendhron
- Location within Germany Location within Rhineland-Palatinate
- Coordinates: 49°47′36.32″N 6°59′36.43″E
- Country: Germany
- State: Rhineland-Palatinate
- District: Bernkastel-Wittlich
- Municipal assoc.: Thalfang am Erbeskopf

Government
  - Mayor (2019–24): Hans Günther Steinmetz

Area
  - Total: 3.13 km^{2} (1.21 sq mi)
- Elevation: 230 m (750 ft)

Population (2025-12-31)
  - Total: 101
  - Density: 32.3/km^{2} (83.6/sq mi)
- Time zone: UTC+01:00 (CET)
  - Summer (DST): UTC+02:00 (CEST)
- Postal codes: 54426
- Dialling codes: 06504
- Vehicle registration: WIL
- Website: www.graefendhron.de

Gräfendhron is an Ortsgemeinde – a municipality belonging to a Verbandsgemeinde, a kind of collective municipality – in the Bernkastel-Wittlich district in Rhineland-Palatinate, Germany.

== Geography ==
The municipality lies in the Hunsrück and belongs to the Verbandsgemeinde of Thalfang am Erbeskopf, whose seat is in the municipality of Thalfang.

== History ==
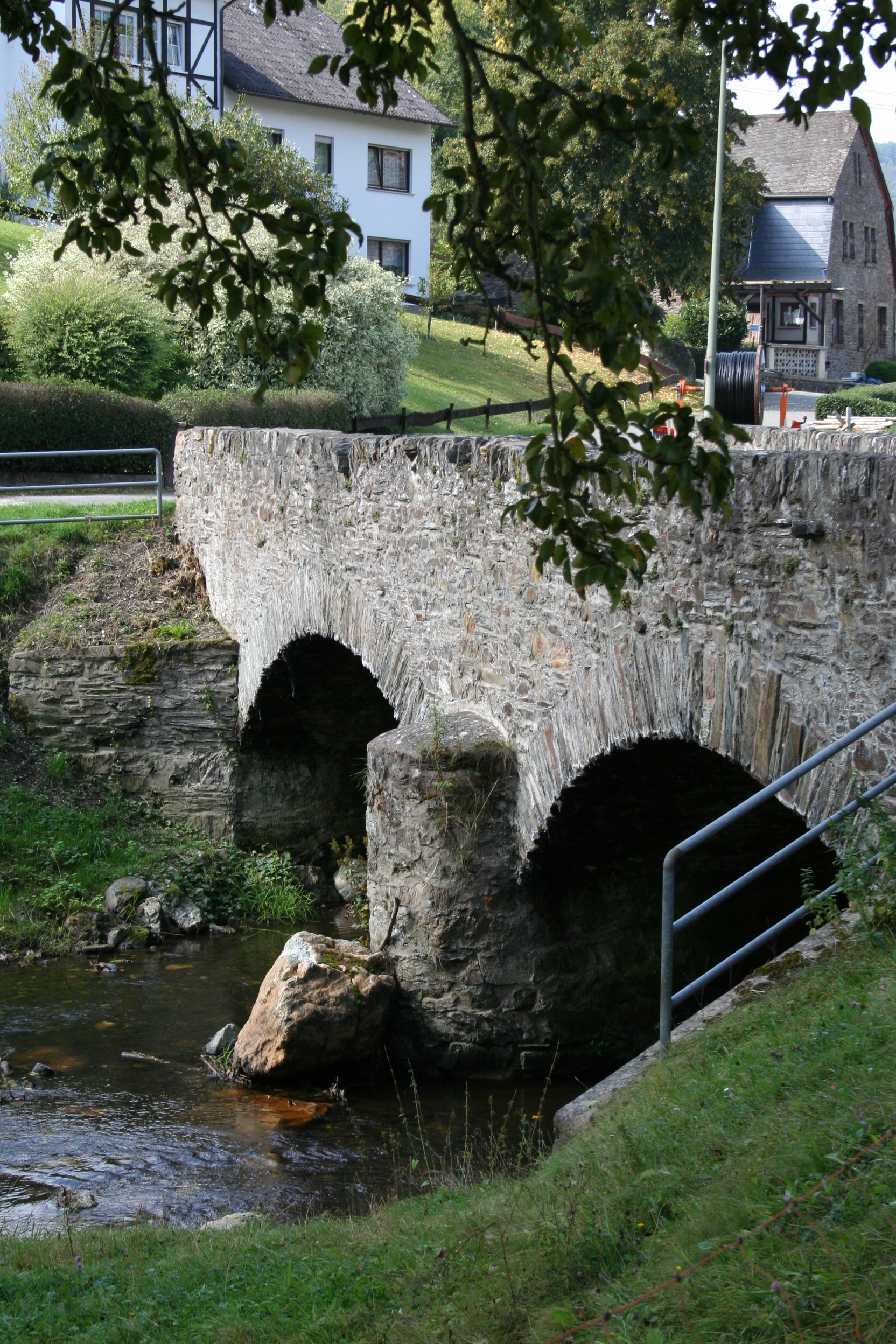
Bridge over the Dhron

On 3 May 1255, Gräfendhron had its first documentary mention when Nikolaus, the Vogt at Hunolstein bequeathed his wife an estate at Drogene as a widow's seat. As a result of the turmoil of the French Revolution, Gräfendhron lay under French rule beginning about 1800. In 1814 it was assigned to the Kingdom of Prussia at the Congress of Vienna. Since 1947, it has been part of the then newly founded state of Rhineland-Palatinate. Since administrative reform in Rhineland-Palatinate in 1969, the municipality has belonged to the Verbandsgemeinde of Thalfang am Erbeskopf.

== Politics ==
=== Municipal council ===
The council is made up of 6 council members, who were elected by majority vote at the municipal election held on 7 June 2009, and the honorary mayor as chairman.

=== Mayors ===
In 2007, Hans Günther Steinmetz was elected with 66.7% of the vote, and was confirmed in office in 2009. He succeeded Herbert Züscher.

=== Coat of arms ===
The municipality's arms might be described thus: Per fess, argent a cross gules and argent two bars between twelve billets five, four and three, all of the second.

== Economy and infrastructure ==
Gräfendhron is a rural residential community. There are small businesses serving local demands.
