= Berglicht =

- Municipality
- Coat of arms

- Location of Berglicht within Bernkastel-Wittlich district
- Interactive map of Berglicht
- Location within Germany Location within Rhineland-Palatinate
- Coordinates: 49°47′17.74″N 06°57′59.40″E
- Country: Germany
- State: Rhineland-Palatinate
- District: Bernkastel-Wittlich
- Municipal assoc.: Thalfang am Erbeskopf

Government
  - Mayor (2019–24): Michael Reusch

Area
  - Total: 7.55 km^{2} (2.92 sq mi)
- Elevation: 390 m (1,280 ft)

Population (2025-12-31)
  - Total: 463
  - Density: 61.3/km^{2} (159/sq mi)
- Time zone: UTC+01:00 (CET)
  - Summer (DST): UTC+02:00 (CEST)
- Postal codes: 54426
- Dialling codes: 06504
- Vehicle registration: WIL
- Website: www.berglicht.de

Berglicht is an Ortsgemeinde – a municipality belonging to a Verbandsgemeinde, a kind of collective municipality – in the Bernkastel-Wittlich district in Rhineland-Palatinate, Germany.

== Geography ==
The municipality lies in the Hunsrück and belongs to the Verbandsgemeinde of Thalfang am Erbeskopf, whose seat is in the municipality of Thalfang.

== History ==
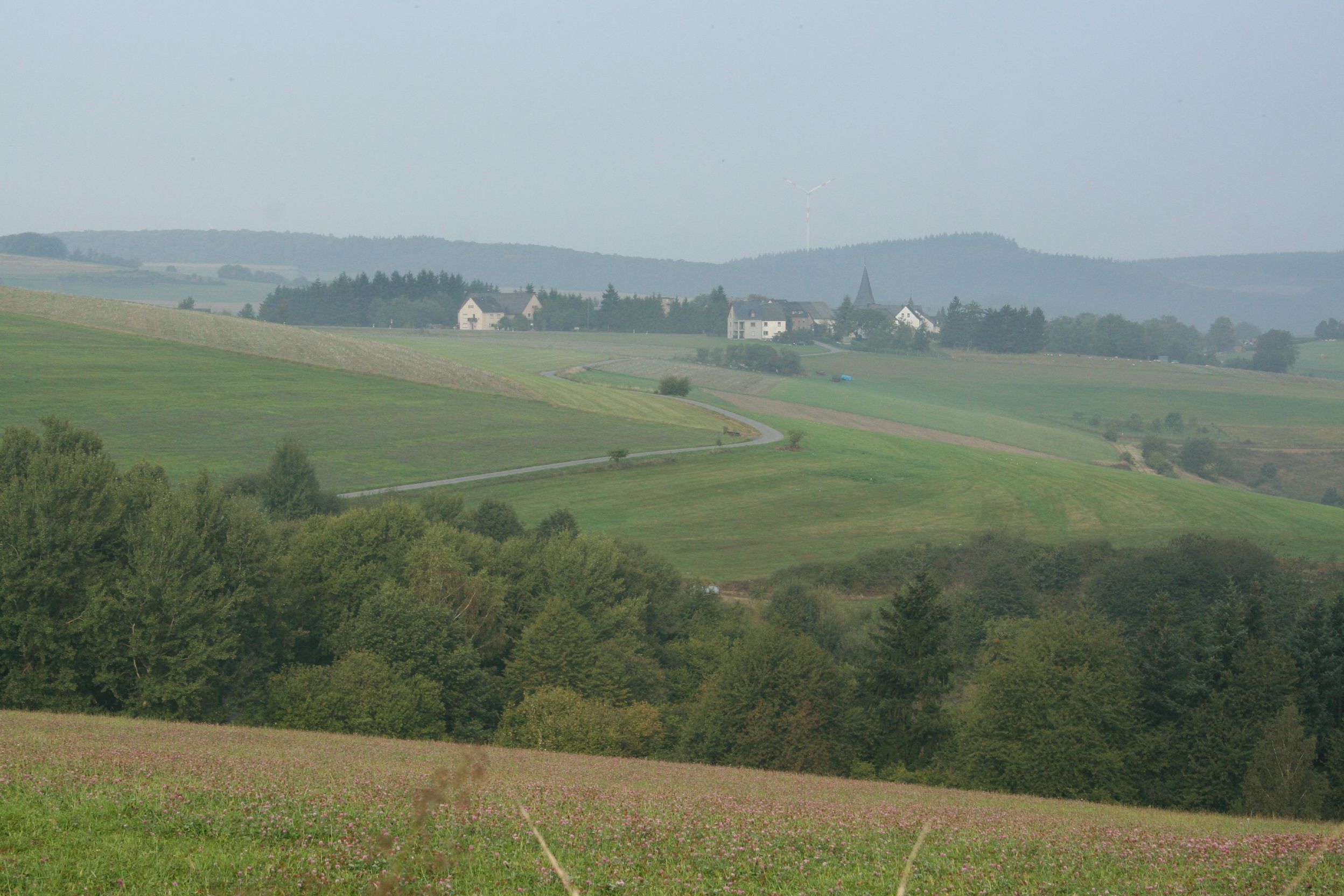
Berglicht

In 1228, Berglicht had its first documentary mention. Originally, the municipality was two centres named Berg (on the Hangrücken) and Licht (on the Lichterbach). The church in Berg held its own jurisdiction and was mother church to many parishes in what is today the Deaconry of Morbach. An end was put to the centuries-long lordship of the Counts of Hunolstein about 1800 by the French Revolution. After French rule ended, the municipality passed to the Kingdom of Prussia. Since 1947, it has been part of the then newly founded state of Rhineland-Palatinate. Until municipal administrative reform in Rhineland-Palatinate in 1969, the municipality belonged to the district of Bernkastel, whose seat was at Bernkastel-Kues.

== Politics ==
=== Municipal council ===
The council is made up of 8 council members, who were elected by proportional representation at the municipal election held on 7 June 2009, and the honorary mayor as chairman.

The municipal election held on 7 June 2009 yielded the following results:

Year	FWG Reusch	FWG "Uss Doorf"	Total
2009	5	3	8 seats

=== Coat of arms ===
The municipality's arms might be described thus: Argent a fess enhanced and a pale to dexter gules, in base sinister a heart voided and within, a cross, the top arm joined to the cusp of the heart, sable, all within a bordure vert.
