= Hunsrück Club =

Hiking club

The Hunsrück Club (German: Hunsrückverein) is a regional local history, cultural and rambling club in the German state of Rhineland-Palatinate. It is a member of the Association of German Mountain and Rambling Clubs (Verband Deutscher Gebirgs- und Wandervereine) which has 55 members in German.

The Hunsrück Club manages numerous hiking trails, paths and hostels in the mountain of the Hunsrück. It was founded in 1890 as the "Club for the Moselle, Hochwald and Hunsrück" (Verein für Mosel, Hochwald und Hunsrück). It has almost 40 branches including 20 local rambling groups and around 3,000 members. The club is not just dedicated to ramblers but also researches the cultural history of the Hunsrück. The club also assists in maintaining footpaths that reach beyond the Hunsrück, for example, European long-distance paths like the E 3 and E 8 and the Rhine Ridgeway, Saar Footpath and Saar-Mosel Way. Paths that it is solely responsible for include the Ausonius Way, the Nahe–Moselle Celtic Way from Kirn via Kirchberg to Treis-Karden and eight other trails across and around the Hunsrück.

== Publications ==
- Hochwald- und Hunsrückführer, 1st edn, 1892, last edn. (No. 17 in 1959) succeeded by:
- Landesgeschichtlicher Exkursionsführer Hunsrück, Otterbach, Arbogast, ISBN 3-87022-183-6

== See also ==
- Hunsrück History Society
