= Merschbach =

- Municipality
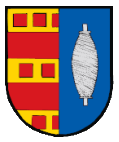
- Coat of arms

- Location of Merschbach within Bernkastel-Wittlich district
- Interactive map of Merschbach
- Location within Germany Location within Rhineland-Palatinate
- Coordinates: 49°48′12″N 07°00′20″E
- Country: Germany
- State: Rhineland-Palatinate
- District: Bernkastel-Wittlich
- Municipal assoc.: Thalfang am Erbeskopf

Government
  - Mayor (2019–24): Iris Hornberg

Area
  - Total: 3.20 km^{2} (1.24 sq mi)
- Elevation: 280 m (920 ft)

Population (2025-12-31)
  - Total: 58
  - Density: 18/km^{2} (47/sq mi)
- Time zone: UTC+01:00 (CET)
  - Summer (DST): UTC+02:00 (CEST)
- Postal codes: 54426
- Dialling codes: 06504
- Vehicle registration: WIL

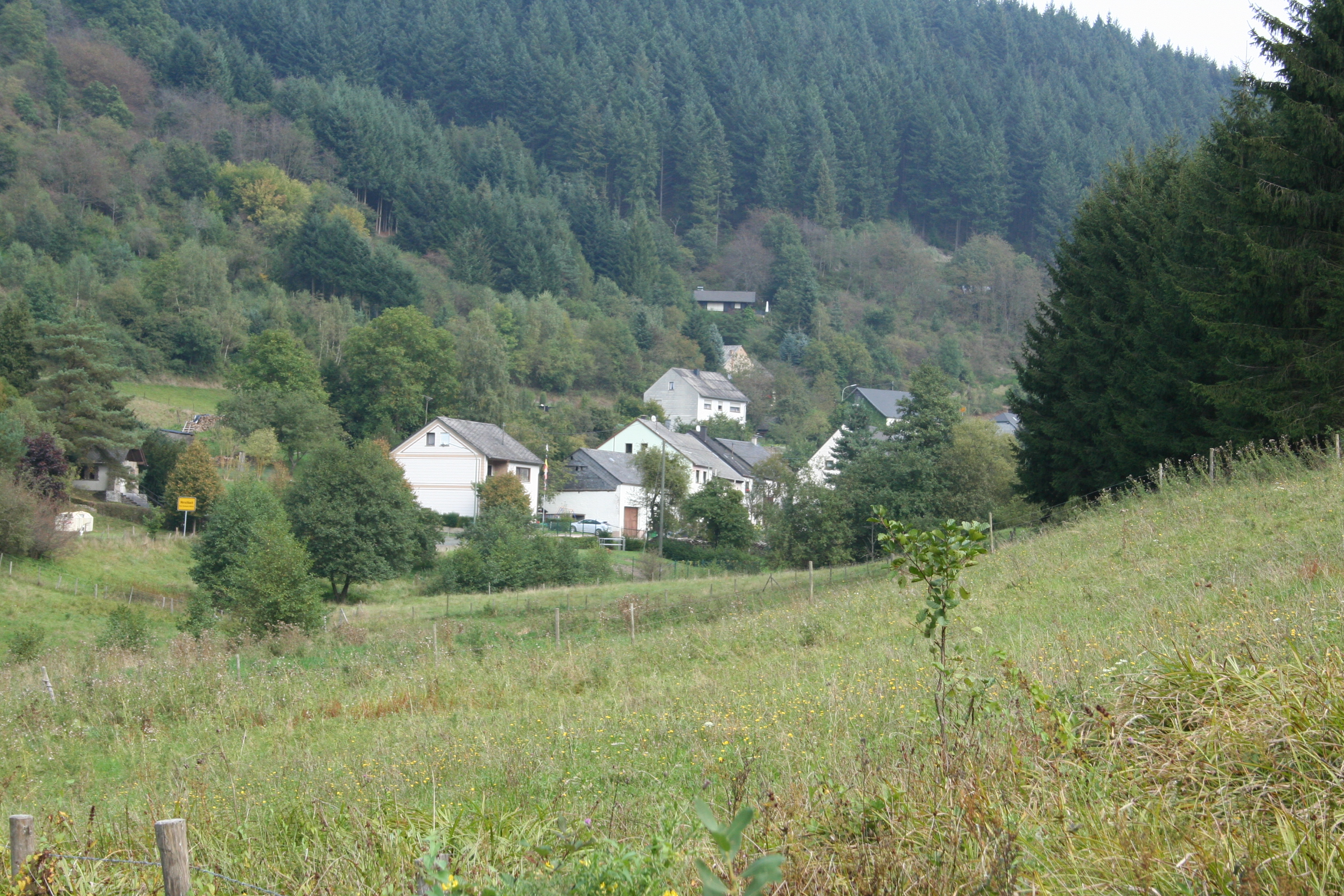
Merschbach

Merschbach is an Ortsgemeinde – a municipality belonging to a Verbandsgemeinde, a kind of collective municipality – in the Bernkastel-Wittlich district in Rhineland-Palatinate, Germany.

== Geography ==
The municipality lies in the Dhron valley in the Hunsrück. Merschbach belongs to the Verbandsgemeinde of Thalfang am Erbeskopf, whose seat is in the municipality of Thalfang.

== History ==
In 1281, Merschbach, which at the time was held by the Counts of Hunolstein, had its first documentary mention. As a result of the turmoil of the French Revolution, Merschbach lay under French rule beginning about 1800. In 1814 it was assigned to the Kingdom of Prussia at the Congress of Vienna. Since 1947, it has been part of the then newly founded state of Rhineland-Palatinate.

=== Population development ===
Since the 1970s, the municipality's population has shrunk markedly. While Merschbach still had 104 inhabitants in 1970 when the Verbandsgemeinde of Thalfang am Erbeskopf was founded, by March 2009, there were only 61.

== Politics ==
The municipal council is made up of 6 council members, who were elected by majority vote at the municipal election held on 7 June 2009, and the honorary mayor as chairwoman.

== Culture and sightseeing ==
=== Buildings ===
Merschbach has at its disposal a small chapel.

=== Natural monuments ===
Among the municipality's natural monuments are a limetree and an oak.
