= Thalfang =

- Municipality
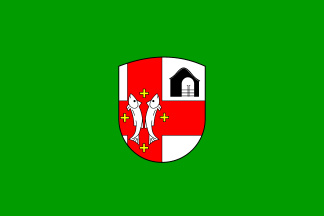
- Flag Coat of arms

- Location of Thalfang within Bernkastel-Wittlich district
- Interactive map of Thalfang
- Location within Germany Location within Rhineland-Palatinate
- Coordinates: 49°45′21″N 06°59′48″E
- Country: Germany
- State: Rhineland-Palatinate
- District: Bernkastel-Wittlich
- Municipal assoc.: Thalfang am Erbeskopf

Government
  - Mayor: Stephan Müller

Area
  - Total: 19.44 km^{2} (7.51 sq mi)
- Elevation: 460 m (1,510 ft)

Population (2025-12-31)
  - Total: 1,866
  - Density: 95.99/km^{2} (248.6/sq mi)
- Time zone: UTC+01:00 (CET)
  - Summer (DST): UTC+02:00 (CEST)
- Postal codes: 54424
- Dialling codes: 06504
- Vehicle registration: WIL
- Website: https://www.luftkurort-thalfang.de/

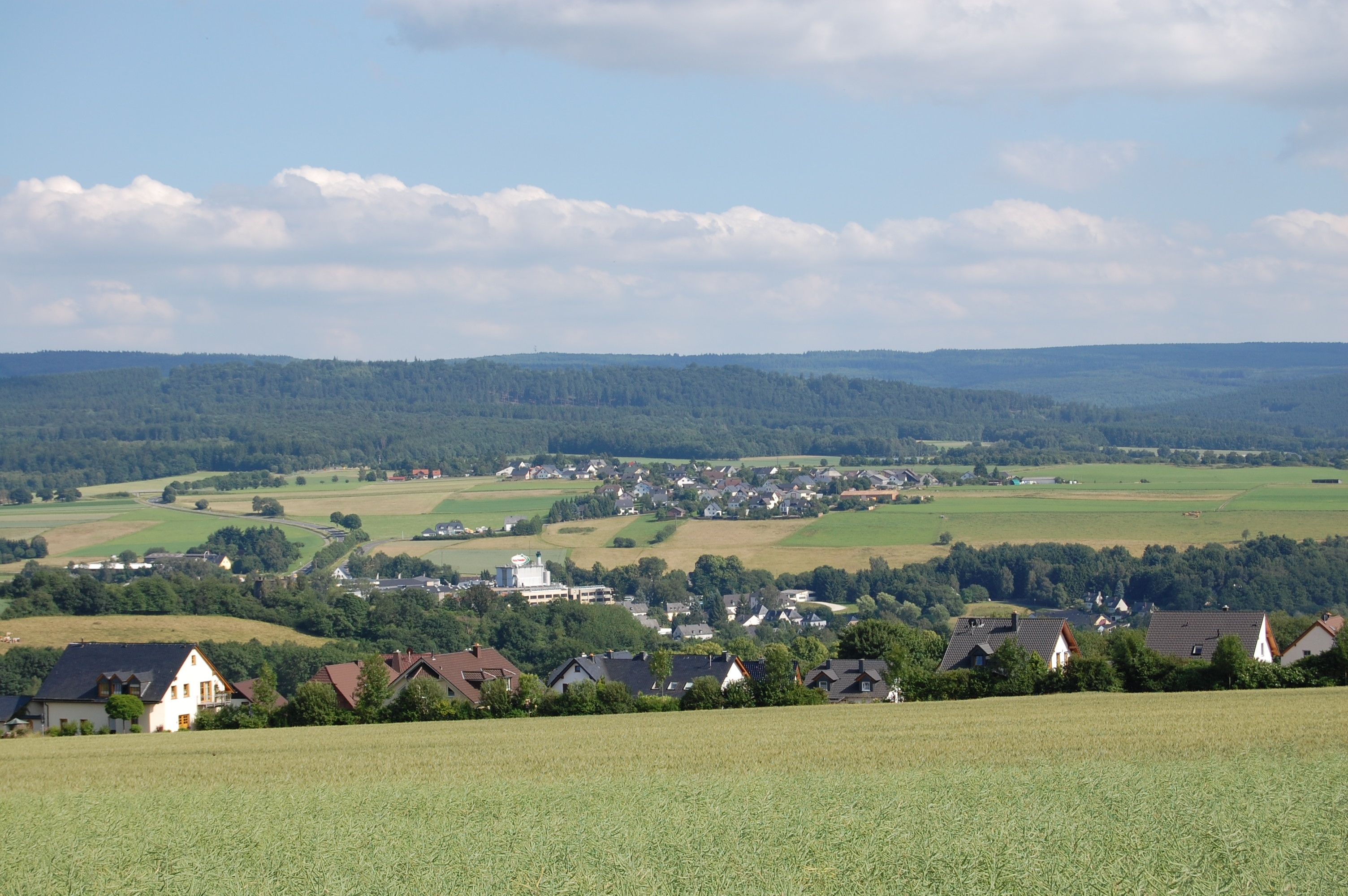
Thalfang and Bäsch, in the background the Schwarzwälder Hochwald

The climatic spa (Luftkurort) of Thalfang is an Ortsgemeinde – a municipality belonging to a Verbandsgemeinde, a kind of collective municipality – in the Bernkastel-Wittlich district in Rhineland-Palatinate, Germany. It is the seat of the Verbandsgemeinde of Thalfang am Erbeskopf.

== Geography ==
=== Location ===
The municipality lies in the western Hunsrück on the Hunsrückhöhenstraße (“Hunsrück Heights Road”, a scenic road across the Hunsrück built originally as a military road on Hermann Göring’s orders), some 7 km northwest of the Erbeskopf. Thalfang lies roughly 25 km southeast of Wittlich and 25 km east of Trier. Through the municipality flows the Thalfanger Bach.

=== Constituent communities ===
Thalfang’s only outlying Ortsteil is Bäsch.

== History ==
In 632, Thalfang had its first documentary mention. Beginning in the 12th century, Thalfang belonged to the Mark Dhronecken.

On a map of the Archbishopric of Trier from 1645, the village is shown as Thalfinck.

Only under French rule was the Mark Dhronecken dissolved, and the Mayoralties (Mairies) of Talling and Thalfang came into being. To the Mayoralty of Thalfang also belonged the villages of Bäsch, Burtscheid, Deuselbach, Dhronecken, Etgert, Hilscheid, Immert, Malborn, Rorodt and a place called Röderbach, which was forsaken about 1900. However, only 19 years later, once the Prussians held sway in the region, the Mayoralties of Talling and Thalfang were united into an entity called the Amt of Thalfang. Since 1947, Thalfang has belonged to the state of Rhineland-Palatinate. On 7 June 1969, the Ortsgemeinde of Bäsch was amalgamated with Thalfang. In the years from 1969 to 1972, the Ortsgemeinden of Gräfendhron, Horath, Merschbach, Büdlich, Breit and Heidenburg were grouped together with Thalfang to form the Verbandsgemeinde of Thalfang am Erbeskopf.

Among other historical events it might be noted that Erich Honecker, later the East German leader, worked as a roofer in the 1920s during the construction of what was then to be the new town hall.

== Politics ==
=== Municipal council ===
The council is made up of 16 council members, who were elected by proportional representation at the municipal election held on 7 June 2009, and the honorary mayor as chairman.

The municipal election held on 7 June 2009 yielded the following results:

Year	SPD	CDU	FDP	FL	Total
2009	5	5	3	3	16 seats
2004	5	6	2	3	16 seats
1999	5	7	2	2	16 seats

=== Coat of arms ===
The municipality's arms might be described thus: Argent a cross abased and to dexter gules, surmounting the centre of which two salmon addorsed of the field between four crosses Or, in sinister chief, an arched church gateway with gates closed sable.

The red cross on the silver field refers to the former allegiance to the Electorate of Trier. The two salmon among the four golden crosses are drawn from the arms formerly borne by the Counts of Salm (Salm means “salmon” in German). They refer to Count Ernst, the only one of the Waldgraves and Rhinegraves from this family who is buried at the graveyard in Thalfang; the salmon motif is also carved into his gravestone. The Rost (“grille”), the way into the churchyard, stands as a symbol for the oldest building in Thalfang.

== Economy and infrastructure ==
=== Established businesses ===
Thalfang is headquarters to the Hochwald Nahrungsmittel-Werke (“foodworks”), the biggest commercial enterprise in the Trier region and one of Germany's biggest dairy businesses.

=== Transport ===
Thalfang lies on the Hunsrückhöhenstraße between Hermeskeil and Morbach.

=== Tourism ===
The idyllic location and the proximity to tourist destinations such as the Moselle, Trier and the Erbeskopf, as well as the relatively short distance to Luxembourg and France, make Thalfang a popular holiday destination.

== Famous people ==
=== Sons and daughters of the town ===
Thalfang's foremost son is the rabbi and philosopher Samuel Hirsch (1815–1889). The German engineer and chemist Wilhelm Kathol died in Thalfang in 1944.
