= Morbach =

- Municipality
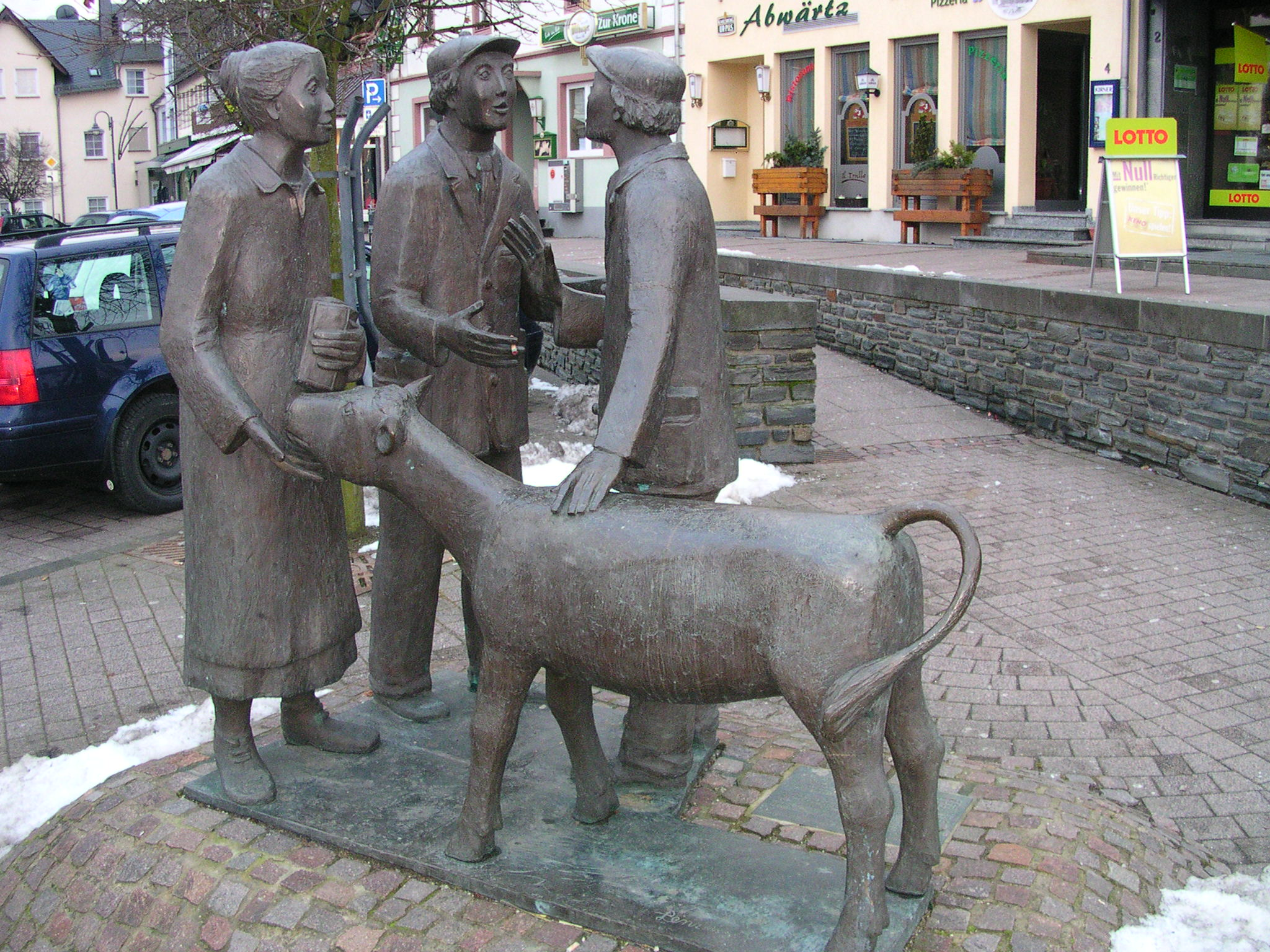
- Memorial to the restoration of Morbach

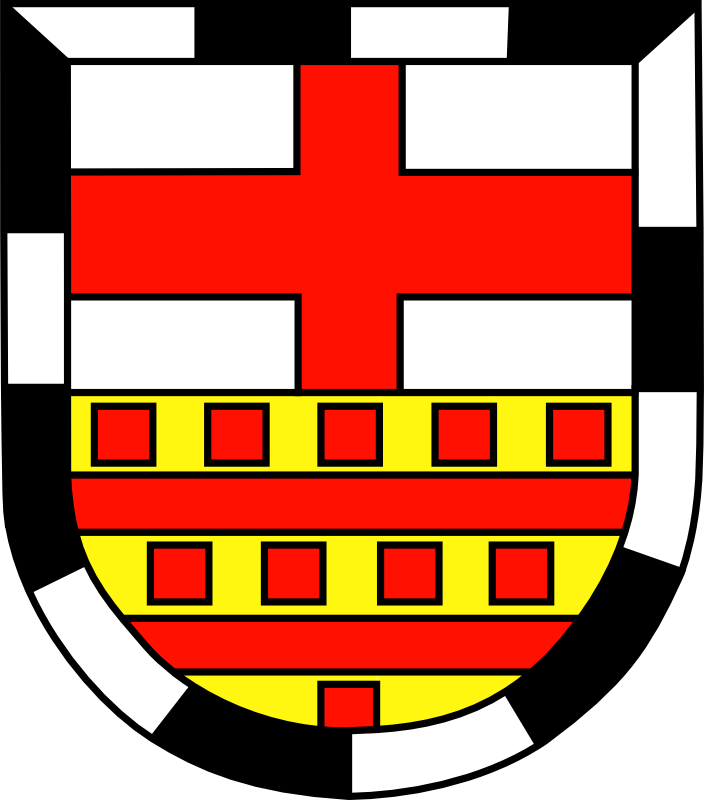
- Coat of arms

- Location of Morbach within Bernkastel-Wittlich district
- Interactive map of Morbach
- Location within Germany Location within Rhineland-Palatinate
- Coordinates: 49°49′N 7°7′E
- Country: Germany
- State: Rhineland-Palatinate
- District: Bernkastel-Wittlich

Government
  - Mayor (2019–27): Andreas Hackethal (CDU)

Area
  - Total: 122.20 km^{2} (47.18 sq mi)
- Elevation: 430–770 m (1,410–2,530 ft)

Population (2025-12-31)
  - Total: 10,473
  - Density: 85.704/km^{2} (221.97/sq mi)
- Time zone: UTC+01:00 (CET)
  - Summer (DST): UTC+02:00 (CEST)
- Postal codes: 54497
- Dialling codes: 06533
- Vehicle registration: WIL, BKS
- Website: www.morbach.de

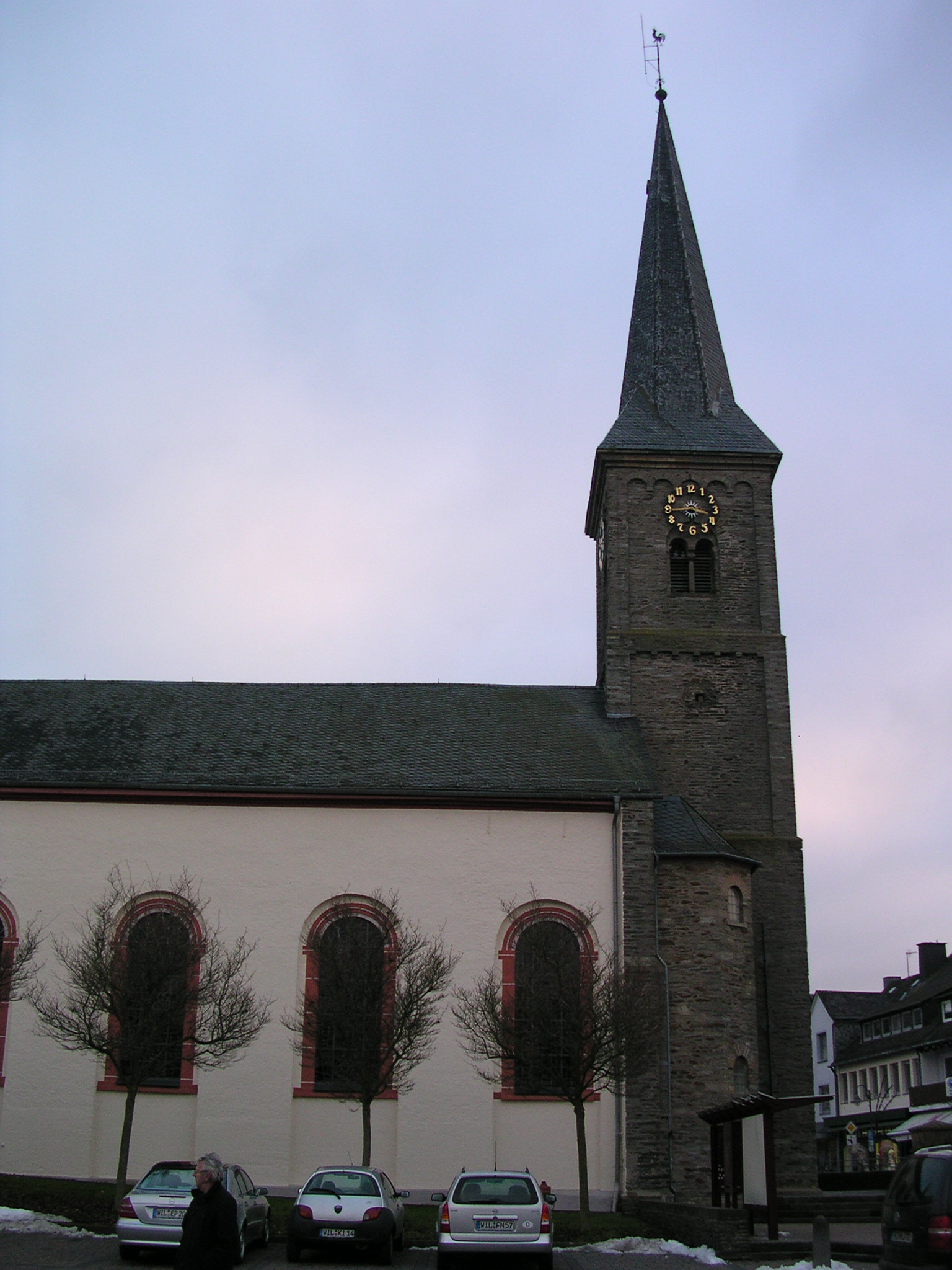
Church

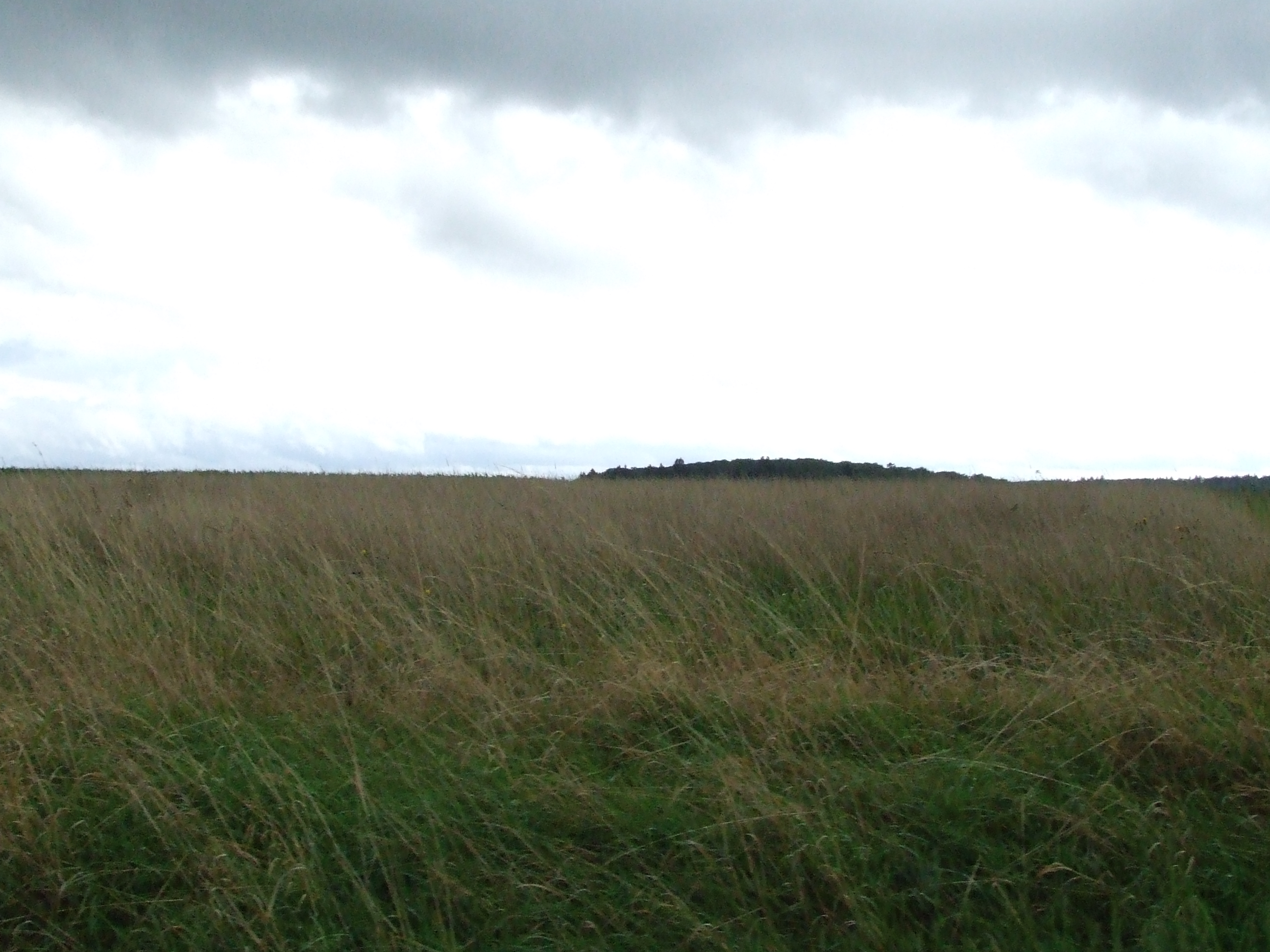
Typical original Hunsrück countryside in the region around Morbach

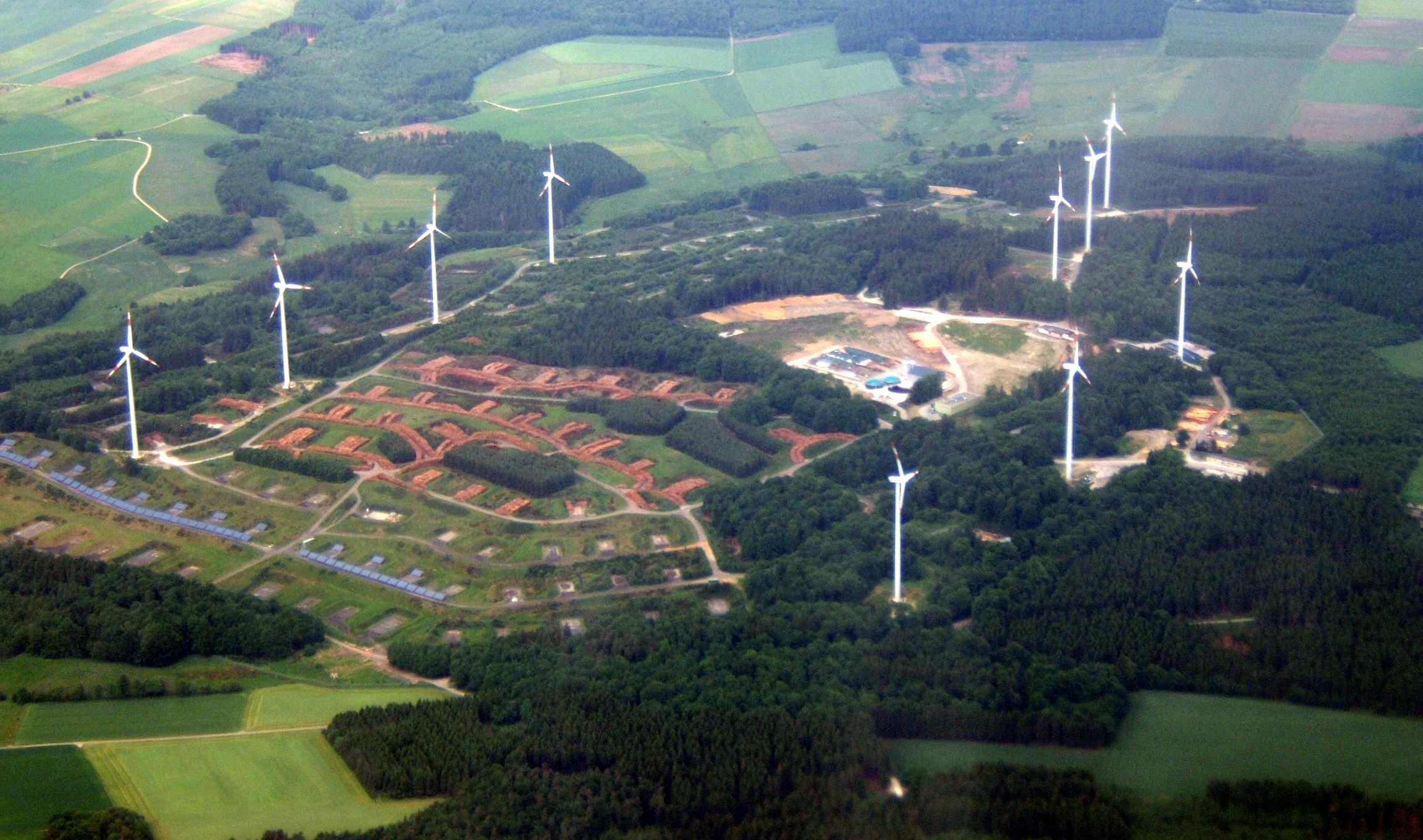
Energiepark Morbach

Morbach is a municipality that belongs to no Verbandsgemeinde – a kind of collective municipality – in the Bernkastel-Wittlich district in Rhineland-Palatinate, Germany. It is also a state-recognized climatic resort (Luftkurort).

== Geography ==
=== Location ===
The municipality lies at an elevation of between 430 and 770 m above sea level in the low mountain range of the Hunsrück on the boundary with the Birkenfeld district, roughly 25 km southeast of Wittlich and 35 km east of Trier. Its population is 11,051. The nearest town is Bernkastel-Kues.

The terrain is one of rolling hills, with superbly organized and maintained stretches of forest interspersed with manicured farmland. Some of the highest (cleanest) air readings in all of Northern Europe have been measured near this area.

=== Climate ===
Precipitation diagram

Yearly precipitation in Morbach amounts to 1,175 mm (46.3 in), which is very high, falling into the highest tenth of the precipitation chart for all Germany. At 92% of the German Weather Service's weather stations, lower figures are recorded. The driest month is May. The most rainfall comes in December. In that month, precipitation is 1.8 times what it is in May. Precipitation varies greatly. At more than 85% of the weather stations, lower seasonal swings are recorded.

=== Constituent communities ===
The municipality of Morbach is subdivided into the following Ortsteile:

- Bischofsdhron
- Elzerath
- Gonzerath
- Gutenthal
- Haag
- Heinzerath
- Hinzerath
- Hoxel
- Hundheim
- Hunolstein
- Merscheid mit Hölzbach, Dörrwiese und Götzenfeld
- Morbach
- Morscheid-Riedenburg
- Odert
- Rapperath
- Wederath
- Weiperath
- Wenigerath
- Wolzburg

== History ==
Until municipal administrative reform in Rhineland-Palatinate in 1969, the municipality belonged to the Bernkastel district, with its seat at Bernkastel-Kues. The municipality as it is today arose on 31 December 1974 when the new municipality of Morbach was formed out of Morbach itself and the 18 until then self-administering municipalities of Bischofsdhron, Elzerath, Gonzerath, Gutenthal, Haag, Heinzerath, Hinzerath, Hoxel, Hundheim, Hunolstein, Merscheid, Morscheid-Riedenburg, Odert, Rapperath, Wederath, Weiperath, Wenigerath and Wolzburg.

Within what is now the outlying centre of Wenigerath lay the US Air Force's Wenigerath Munitions Depot until 1995. Beginning in the 1950s, several hundred United States Air Force Munitions Systems personnel, otherwise known as “ammo troops”, worked at the so-called Wenigerath Non-Nuclear Munitions Storage Area and lived in Morbach and neighbouring villages in support of NATO operations launched from nearby Hahn Air base. The former “bomb dump”, which ceased operations after the collapse of the Soviet Union and the end of the Cold War, is now dotted with wind turbines, photovoltaic cells and various technologies which serve as an “Energy Farm”.

== Politics ==
=== Municipal council ===
The council is made up of 28 honorary council members, who were elected at the municipal election held on 7 June 2009, and the full-time mayor as chairman.

The municipal election held on 7 June 2009 yielded the following results:

	Party	Share of the vote	Swing	Seats	Swing
1.	CDU	42.1%	(-8.2)	12 seats	(-3)
2.	FWM	23.2%	(+1.3)	6 seats	(-1)
3.	SPD	17.3%	(+3.6)	5 seats	(+1)
4.	FDP	7.7%	(+3.3)	2 seats	(+1)
5.	Alliance '90/The Greens	6.4%	(=)	2 seats	(+1)
6.	The Left	3.3%	(+3.3)	1 seat	(+1)

== Culture and sightseeing ==
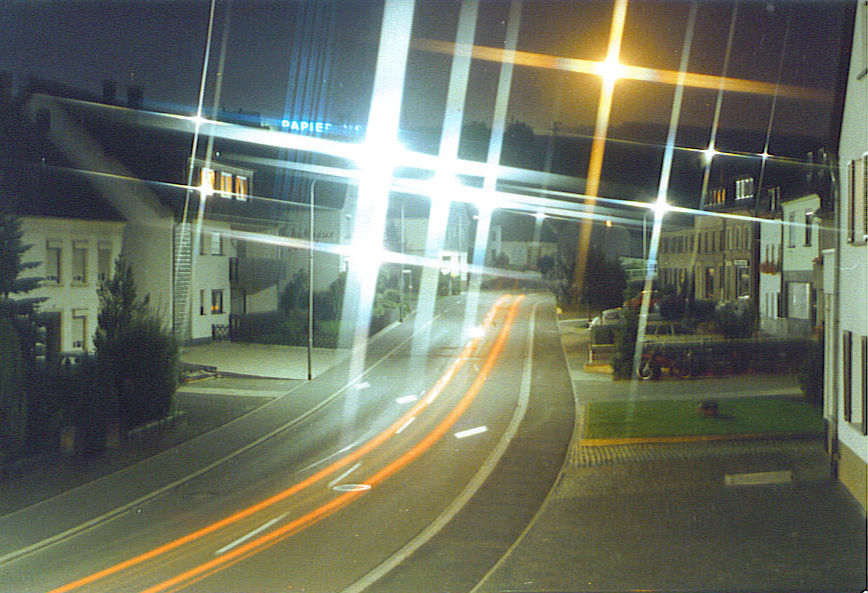
A street in Morbach at night – 1986

There is a railway viaduct in the outlying centre of Hoxel, which is one of the highest single-level stone railway bridges in Germany.

Other points of interest in the Morbach area are:

- Castle Baldenau
- the Archäologiepark Belginum, which informs the visitor about the historical settlement of Belginum on the Hunsrückhöhenstraße (“Hunsrück Heights Road”, a scenic road across the Hunsrück built originally as a military road on Hermann Göring’s orders) near Hinzerath
- the wood museum in the outlying centre of Weiperath
- the telephone museum in Morbach.

== Economy and infrastructure ==
=== Established businesses ===
Morbach is headquarters to Papier-Mettler, a German manufacturer of paper and plastic packaging.

=== Transport ===
Public transport is integrated into the Verkehrsverbund Region Trier (VRT), whose fares therefore apply. Bus route 300 of the Rhein-Mosel-Verkehrsgesellschaft links the municipality every two hours with the main railway station in Wittlich on the Koblenz-Trier railway line. Bus route 343 from Omnibusverkehr Rhein-Nahe runs a service on weekdays to the Idar-Oberstein railway station on the Saarbrücken-Mainz railway line.

Through Morbach run Bundesstraßen 269 and 327, as does the Hunsrückquerbahn (“Cross-Hunsrück Railway”), a railway line between Langenlonsheim and Hermeskeil, which at the moment lies idle, although it is to be reactivated, at least from Morbach as far as Bingen, for its usefulness as a link to Frankfurt-Hahn Airport.

The municipality of Morbach is the location of a great wind farm with fourteen wind turbines, a big photovoltaic complex, a biogas complex and a wood pellet works. The rent on the wind farm earns the municipality €280,000 each year.

The municipality of Morbach fulfils the criteria of a “1a” shopping town and was awarded the certificate in May 2008.

== Famous people ==
- Johannes Greber (1874–1944), Catholic priest and spiritualist
- Edgar Reitz (b. 1 November 1932), author, filmmaker, professor of film science
- Jakob Maria Mierscheid (b. 1 March 1933), member of German Bundestag, fictitious politician
- Gabriele Andretta (b. 1961), German politician (SPD), Member of the Lower Saxony Landtag since 1998
- Stefan Gemmel (b. 1970), author of books for children and youth
- Mathias Jacobs (b. 9 September 1885 in Hunolstein, d. 5 May 1935 in Gladbeck), Social Democratic politician and Member of the Prussian Landtag.
