= Hunsrück-Eifel culture =

Iron Age cultural group

The Hunsrück-Eifel Culture (HEK = German: Hunsrück-Eifel-Kultur) is an Iron Age cultural group of the Middle Rhine region of western Germany (Rhineland-Palatinate) and eastern Belgium and Luxembourg. The names "Hunsrück" and "Eifel" refer to a pair of low mountain ranges covering most of the region.

== Overview ==
The Hunsrück-Eifel culture lasted from around the end of the 7th century BC until about 250 BC, thus running roughly parallel in the time-lime of western Germany to the period of the Hallstatt culture (Ha D) as well as the early La Tène culture (Lt A and B).

The expression “Hunsrück-Eifel culture” was coined in 1914 by Karl Schumacher, a specialist in the archaeology of the Roman provinces. This replaced the term "Mehren type", which had been in use in the late 19th century for the Middle Rhine Hallstatt cultures. The “Hunsrück-Eifel culture” and its timeline are defined for the most part by pottery found in its grave-sites.

The Hunsrück-Eifel culture may be roughly divided into an "earlier" (HEK I) and a "later" Hunsrück-Eifel culture (HEK II), the earlier corresponding to the Late Hallstatt period, the later to the Early La Tène period. The transition is generally held to have taken place from around 480–470 B.C.: more precise subdivisions distinguish three levels of the earlier and four levels of the later Hunsrück-Eifel culture.

The earlier HEK evolved from the preceding early Iron Age "Laufeld culture" and remained firmly rooted in Late Bronze Age traditions until the 6th century BC. In the second half of the 6th century BC, the region increasingly came under the influence of the adjacent Hallstatt culture to the south and was, as it were, "Hallstattized". By contrast, the Later HEK is clearly influenced by the early La Tène culture and can be described as "Celtic".

The Hunsrück-Eifel culture is considered a relatively uniform culture, developing without significant interruptions over several centuries. The majority of archaeologists who have studied it believe that there was no significant immigration or emigration among its population. The adherents of the Hunsrück-Eifel culture are also associated with the Treveri, a Celtic tribe clearly documented in later writings.

A comparatively large number of burial-grounds and settlements of the Hunsrück-Eifel culture are known, so that it is assumed to have had a high population density vis-à-vis other regions and epochs.

Of particular significance is a series of ceremonial tombs which were constructed from about 500 B.C. on, reaching their zenith toward the end of the 5th and 4th centuries BC. Some of these tombs are among the best equipped tombs of the early La Tène period, being furnished with gold, imported bronzes, chariots, etc.) and are therefore important for the study of Celtic art styles.

The sites of certain of these finds lie on or near the "Nahe-Moselle Celtic Path," a long-distance hiking path over the Hunsrück.

== Important Sites of the Hunsrück-Eifel Culture ==
- Burial ground of Horath
- Chariot burial of Bell (Hunsrück)
- Burial ground of Bescheid
- Burial ground of Polch

== Sites associated with the subsequent culture of the Treveri ==
- Altburg hilltop fortification near Bundenbach
- Oppidum on the Titelberg in Luxembourg
- Hillfort of Otzenhausen
- Burial-ground of Wederath – Archaeological Park of "Belginum"

== Bibliography ==
- Hans-Eckart Joachim: Die Hunsrück-Eifel Kultur am Mittelrhein (= Bonner Jahrbücher. Beihefte. Bd. 29, ISSN 0067-4893). Böhlau, Köln u. a. 1968 (Zugleich: Freiburg (Breisgau), Universität, Dissertation, vom 29. Juli 1966).
- Alfred Haffner: Die westliche Hunsrück-Eifel-Kultur (= Römisch-Germanische Forschungen. Bd. 36). 2 Bände (Textbd., Tafelbd.). Walter de Gruyter, Berlin 1976, ISBN 3-11-004889-2 (Zugleich: Saarbrücken, Universität, Dissertation, 1967).
- Rosemarie Cordie: Hunsrück-Eifel-Kultur. In the Lexicon of Germanic Antiquity Studies (Reallexikon der Germanischen Altertumskunde) (RGA). 2nd edition, Vol. 15, Walter de Gruyter, Berlin/New York 2000, p(p). 266–271.
- Sabine Hornung: Die südöstliche Hunsrück-Eifel-Kultur. Studien zu Späthallstatt- und Frühlatènezeit in der deutschen Mittelgebirgsregion (= Universitätsforschungen zur prähistorischen Archäologie. Bd. 153). 2 Bände. Habelt, Bonn 2008, ISBN 978-3-7749-3462-7.
- Florian N. Schneider: Neue Studien zur Hunsrück-Eifel-Kultur (= Münchner Archäologische Forschungen Bd. 2). Verlag Marie Leidorf, Rahden (Westfalen) 2012, ISBN 978-3-86757-152-4 (Zugleich: München, Universität, Dissertation, 2008).

This page is a translation of the German Wikipedia page, Hunsrück-Eifel-Kultur.
