= Ravenger =

Ravenger was an eighth century saint and bishop of the Roman Catholic Diocese of Séez.

Ravenger can also refer to:

- A 2015, 43.31 metre, aluminium sailing sloop. See: List of large sailing yachts.
- Ravenger e.V. für Brauchstumpflege a club in Ravengiersburg
