= List of national parks of Germany =

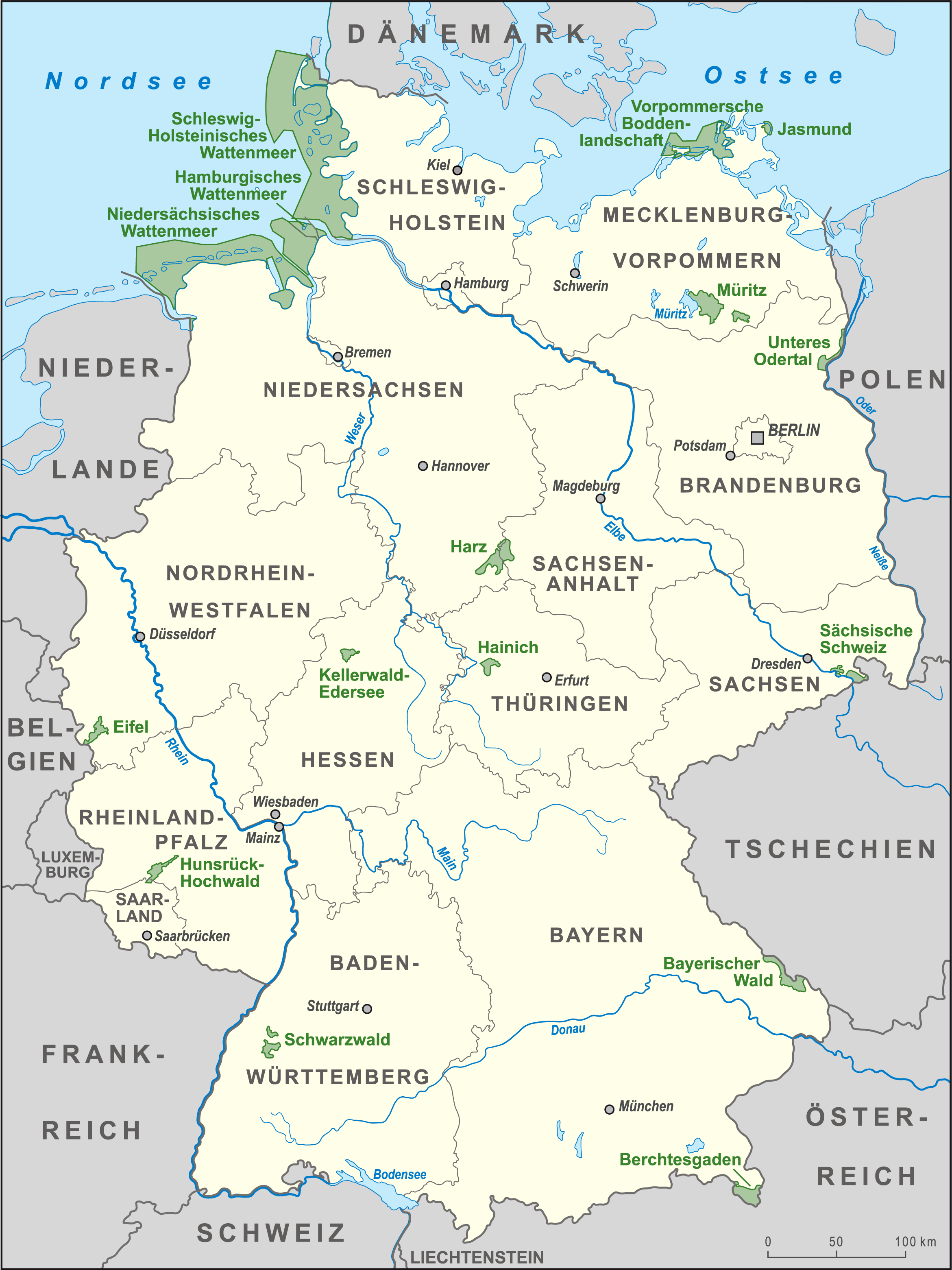
Map of all 16 German national parks (2014)

The following are the 16 national parks of Germany, sorted from North to South:

Photo	Name	OpenStreetMap
	Schleswig-Holstein Wadden Sea National Park	1237758
	Hamburg Wadden Sea National Park	157812
	Lower Saxon Wadden Sea National Park	157811
	Jasmund National Park	253073
	Western Pomerania Lagoon Area National Park	1138522
	Müritz National Park	7890483
	Lower Oder Valley National Park	215294
	Harz National Park	90584
	Kellerwald-Edersee National Park (a part of Kellerwald)	12048753
	Hainich National Park	3650072
	Eifel National Park	2345991
	Hunsrück-Hochwald National Park	4120974
	Saxon Switzerland National Park	1595534
	Bavarian Forest National Park	1864214
	Berchtesgaden National Park	4292200
	Black Forest National Park	3412590

Germany also has 14 biosphere reserves, as well as 98 nature parks. Including the national protected areas, about 25% of Germany's area is national parks or nature parks.

== See also ==
- Natural National Landscapes
