= Züsch =

- Municipality
- Coat of arms

- Location of Züsch within Trier-Saarburg district
- Interactive map of Züsch
- Location within Germany Location within Rhineland-Palatinate
- Coordinates: 49°38′54.68″N 7°0′22.100″E
- Country: Germany
- State: Rhineland-Palatinate
- District: Trier-Saarburg
- Municipal assoc.: Hermeskeil

Government
  - Mayor (2019–24): Ulrich Frohn (SPD)

Area
  - Total: 8.04 km^{2} (3.10 sq mi)
- Elevation: 511 m (1,677 ft)

Population (2025-12-31)
  - Total: 567
  - Density: 70.5/km^{2} (183/sq mi)
- Time zone: UTC+01:00 (CET)
  - Summer (DST): UTC+02:00 (CEST)
- Postal codes: 54422
- Dialling codes: 06503
- Vehicle registration: TR

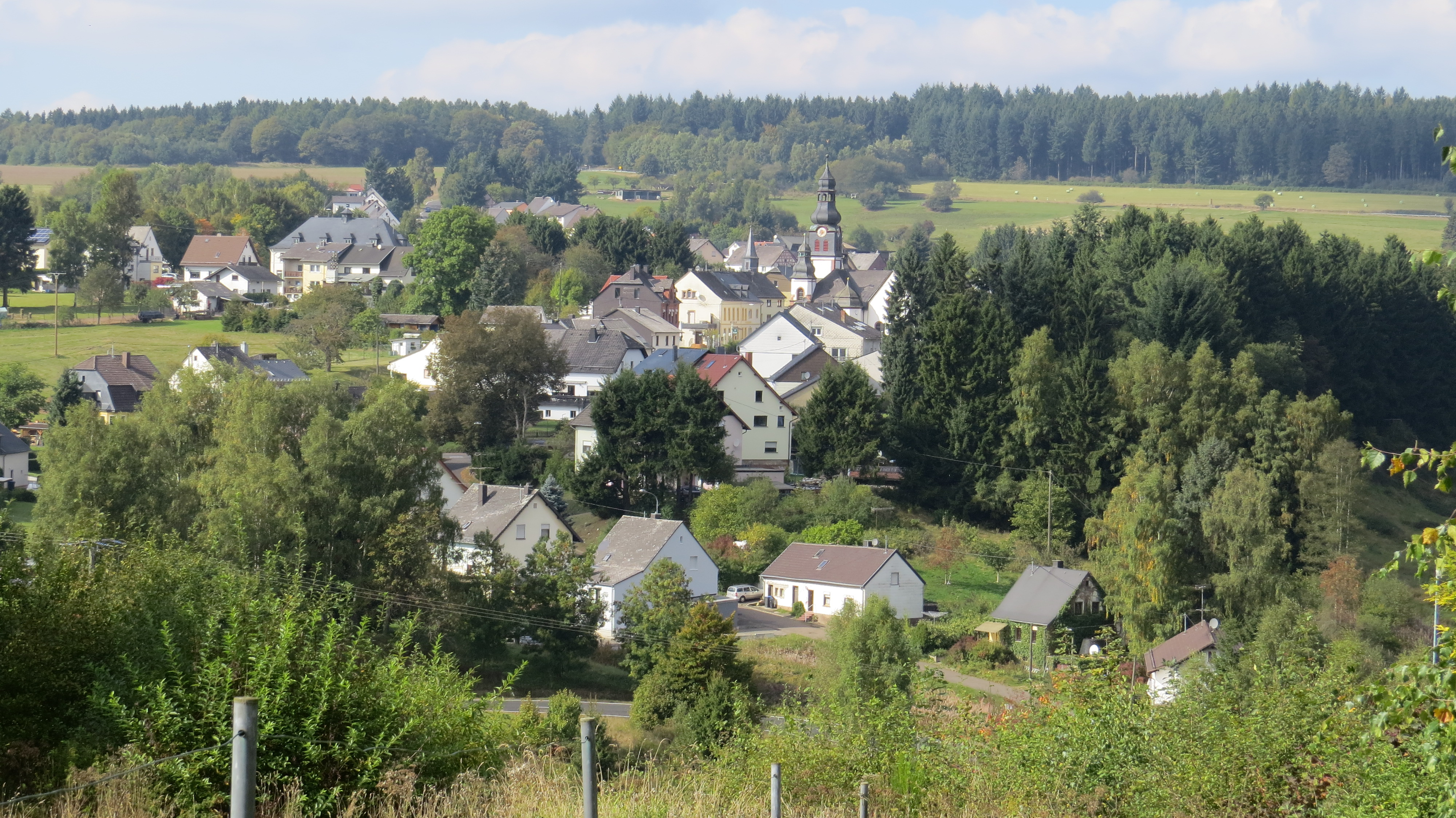

Züsch is a municipality located in Trier-Saarburg county, in the state of Rhineland-Palatinate, Germany. Züsch is located 40 km from Trier, Germany's oldest city. The Frankfurt-Hahn airport is 40 km away.

== Neighboring towns/cities ==
Neuhütten, Damflos, Hermeskeil, Nonnweiler (Saarland), and Muhl.

== Population ==
Population development (as of 31 December each year):

- 1815 – 149
- 1835 – 203
- 1871 – 259
- 1905 – 263
- 1939 – 248
- 1950 – 317
- 1961 – 346
- 1965 – 373
- 1970 – 416
- 1975 – 404
- 1980 – 402
- 1985 – 409
- 1987 – 404
- 1990 – 416
- 1995 – 437
- 2000 – 451
- 2005 – 578

== Politics ==
The town council in Züsch contains twelve members, that were elected on 7 June 2009. Ulrich Frohn became the local mayor of Züsch on July 1, 2019. In the direct election on May 26, 2019, he was elected with 87.03% of the vote. In the direct election on June 9, 2024, he was confirmed in office for another five years with 75.5%.

Frohn’s predecessors were Hermann Bernardy (SPD), who served from 2004, and before him Palmatius Kohlhaas, who held the office for 30 years.

Town council Group member distribution:

Year	SPD	WG Heck	WG Gross	Total
2009	7	3	2	12 Members
	Albert Dietz	Hartmut Heck	Edward Gross	
	Klaus Jung	Thomas Schrenk	Hermann Schmitt	
	Roswitha Bernardy	Georg Steppuhn		
	Jörg Weber			
	Sandra Hein			
	Gereon Priess			
	Claus Patzschke			

== Religion ==
Despite the towns modest population it has the oldest Evangelical church (built in 1837) in Trier-Saarburg county which traces its roots to the time of the reformation in the second half of the 16th century. The Evangelical church has one of only two Spanish Organs located in Germany. The town also has a Catholic church (St. Antonius of Padua) with a renovated baroque interior and exterior facade.

== Schools ==
The elementary school (grades 1-4) has students from Züsch, Neuhütten, and Muhl who transfer to Hermeskeil (a 10-minute bus ride) starting with the 5th grade. On the school grounds is a full size sports hall that is used by the school children during the day. The sports hall is used regularly by the various local clubs (Karate club, Volleyball club, Gymnastics club, etc.) and is also used for various celebrations throughout the year.

== Community Center ==
The community center (recently renovated former guest house Biehl) offers a modern facility suited to host conferences and medium to large family and group celebrations.
