= Naurath (Wald) =

- Municipality
- Coat of arms

- Location of Naurath within Trier-Saarburg district
- Interactive map of Naurath
- Location within Germany Location within Rhineland-Palatinate
- Coordinates: 49°45′40″N 6°52′57″E
- Country: Germany
- State: Rhineland-Palatinate
- District: Trier-Saarburg
- Municipal assoc.: Hermeskeil

Government
  - Mayor (2019–24): Dirk Nabakowski

Area
  - Total: 5.6 km^{2} (2.2 sq mi)
- Elevation: 395 m (1,296 ft)

Population (2025-12-31)
  - Total: 223
  - Density: 40/km^{2} (100/sq mi)
- Time zone: UTC+01:00 (CET)
  - Summer (DST): UTC+02:00 (CEST)
- Postal codes: 54426
- Dialling codes: 06509
- Vehicle registration: TR

Naurath (Wald) (German pronunciation: [ˈnaʊʁaːt]) is a municipality in the Trier-Saarburg district, in Rhineland-Palatinate, Germany.
