= Hermeskeil (Verbandsgemeinde) =

- Verbandsgemeinde
- Location of Hermeskeil within Trier-Saarburg district
- Interactive map of Hermeskeil
- Location within Germany Location within Rhineland-Palatinate
- Coordinates: 49°39′N 6°57′E
- Country: Germany
- State: Rhineland-Palatinate
- District: Trier-Saarburg
- Seat: Hermeskeil
- Subdivisions: 13 municipalities

Area
  - Total: 145.57 km^{2} (56.20 sq mi)

Population (2025-12-31)
  - Total: 15,171
  - Density: 104.22/km^{2} (269.92/sq mi)
- Time zone: UTC+01:00 (CET)
  - Summer (DST): UTC+02:00 (CEST)
- Website: www.hermeskeil.de

Hermeskeil is a Verbandsgemeinde ("collective municipality") in the district Trier-Saarburg, in Rhineland-Palatinate, Germany. The seat of the Verbandsgemeinde is in Hermeskeil.

The Verbandsgemeinde Hermeskeil consists of the following Ortsgemeinden ("local municipalities"):

1. Bescheid
2. Beuren
3. Damflos
4. Geisfeld
5. Grimburg
6. Gusenburg
7. Hermeskeil
8. Hinzert-Pölert
9. Naurath (Wald)
10. Neuhütten
11. Rascheid
12. Reinsfeld
13. Züsch
