= Bahnbetriebswerk Hermeskeil =

Railway museum in Germany

Coordinates: 49°39′26″N 6°55′53″E

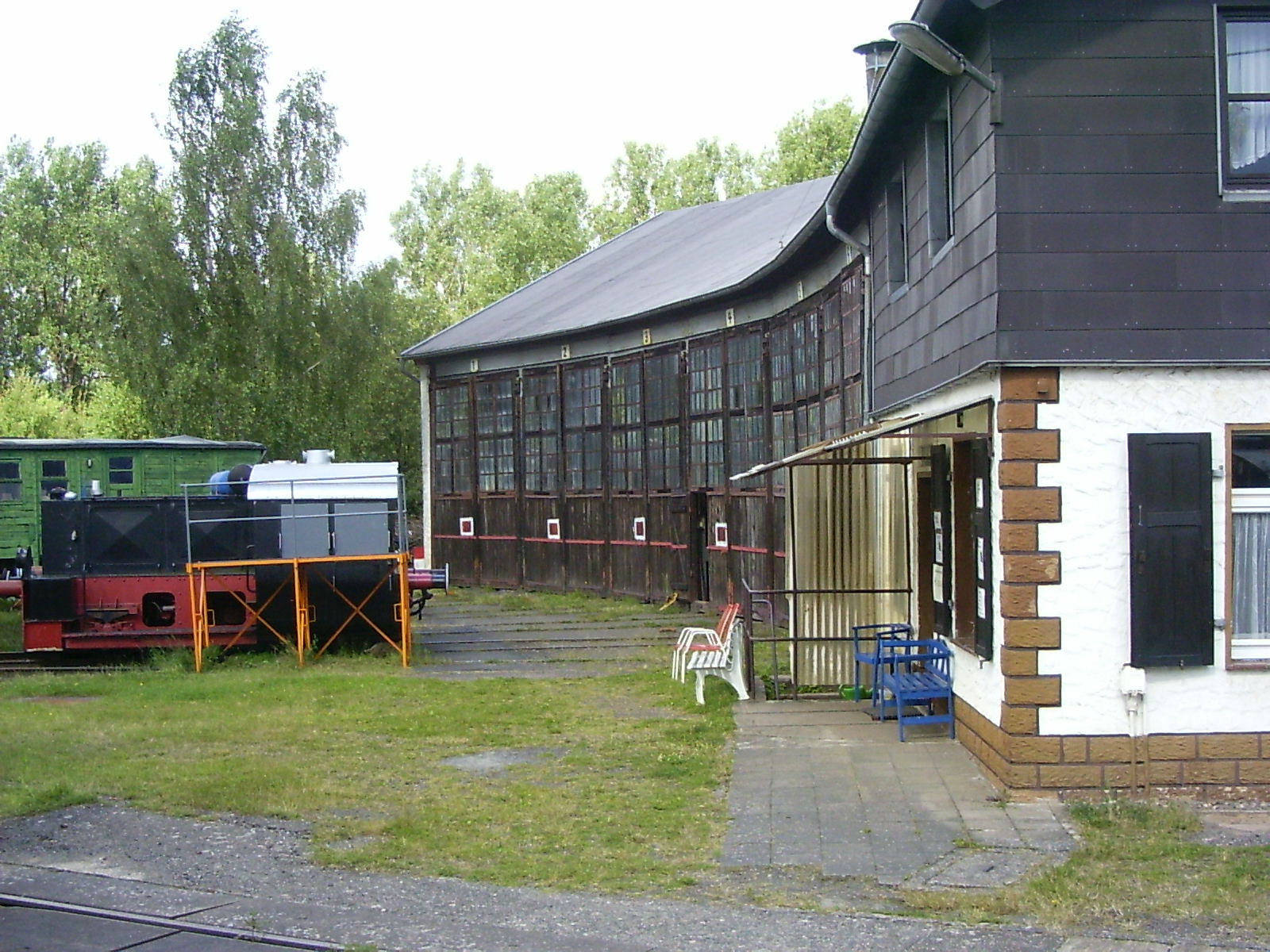
Entrance and engine shed at the Hermeskeil Depot

Bahnbetriebswerk Hermeskeil is a small, Prussian locomotive depot at Hermeskeil, in the state of Rhineland-Palatinate in Germany that dates from 1888. Until 1903, it was called a Maschinenstation (engine station).

The locomotive depot is directly opposite the station building at Hermeskeil station and has a six-road roundhouse (originally two-road) and a 16m turntable (originally 13m). From 1956, the depot became an outstation of Simmern locomotive depot but this was closed on 1 April 1959. Today, it is privately owned and is used as a steam locomotive museum. Around 50 locomotives are stored here, the majority being large steam engines.

== See also ==
- Bahnbetriebswerk
- Bahnbetriebswerk (steam locomotives)
