= Rascheid =

- Municipality
- Coat of arms

- Location of Rascheid within Trier-Saarburg district
- Interactive map of Rascheid
- Location within Germany Location within Rhineland-Palatinate
- Coordinates: 49°42′51″N 6°56′10″E
- Country: Germany
- State: Rhineland-Palatinate
- District: Trier-Saarburg
- Municipal assoc.: Hermeskeil

Government
  - Mayor (2019–24): Andreas Ludwig

Area
  - Total: 8.05 km^{2} (3.11 sq mi)
- Elevation: 463 m (1,519 ft)

Population (2025-12-31)
  - Total: 472
  - Density: 58.6/km^{2} (152/sq mi)
- Time zone: UTC+01:00 (CET)
  - Summer (DST): UTC+02:00 (CEST)
- Postal codes: 54413
- Dialling codes: 06586
- Vehicle registration: TR
- Website: www.rascheid.de

Rascheid is a municipality in the Trier-Saarburg district in Rhineland-Palatinate, Germany. It belongs to the Verbandsgemeinde Hermeskeil and is an officially recognized tourist resort.

== Geography ==
The domiciles Bahnhof Rascheid and Rauschmühle also belong to Rascheid.

== History ==
According to a document dated 980, the village and church belonged to the St. Paulin Abbey in Trier. In the Middle Ages, the town and church belonged to the Neumagen regime, in the fifteenth century to the villagers of Hunolstein, and later to the counts of Sayn-Wittgenstein.

Population Development Statistics

Development of the population of Rascheid, the values from 1871 to 1987 are based on censuses:

Year	Residents
1815	263
1835	361
1871	388
1905	443
1939	513

Year	Residents
1950	494
1961	499
1970	545
1987	534
2005	542

== Politics ==
=== Town Council ===
The town council in Rascheid consists of eight councilors, who were elected by a majority vote in the municipal elections on 25 May 2014, as well as the village's mayor as chairman. Up to 2014 the municipal council consisted of twelve council members.

== Clubs ==
- FCK-Fanclub Zapp-Za-Rapp (Soccer Fanclub FCK)
- Förderverein "Rascheider Ringweg" (friends' association "Rascheider Ringweg")
- Förderverein Fw. Feuerwehr (friends' association voluntary fire brigade)
- Gesangverein Rascheid e.V. 1931 (Choir)
- Jugendclub (Youth Club)
- Karnevalverein Rascheid (Carnival Club)
- Katholische Frauengemeinschaft (catholic female community)
- KEB Rascheid (catholic adult education)
- Musikverein Rascheid 1928 e. V. (Orchestra)
- Sportverein Rascheid 1947 e.V. (Sports Club)
