= Wildenburger Kopf =

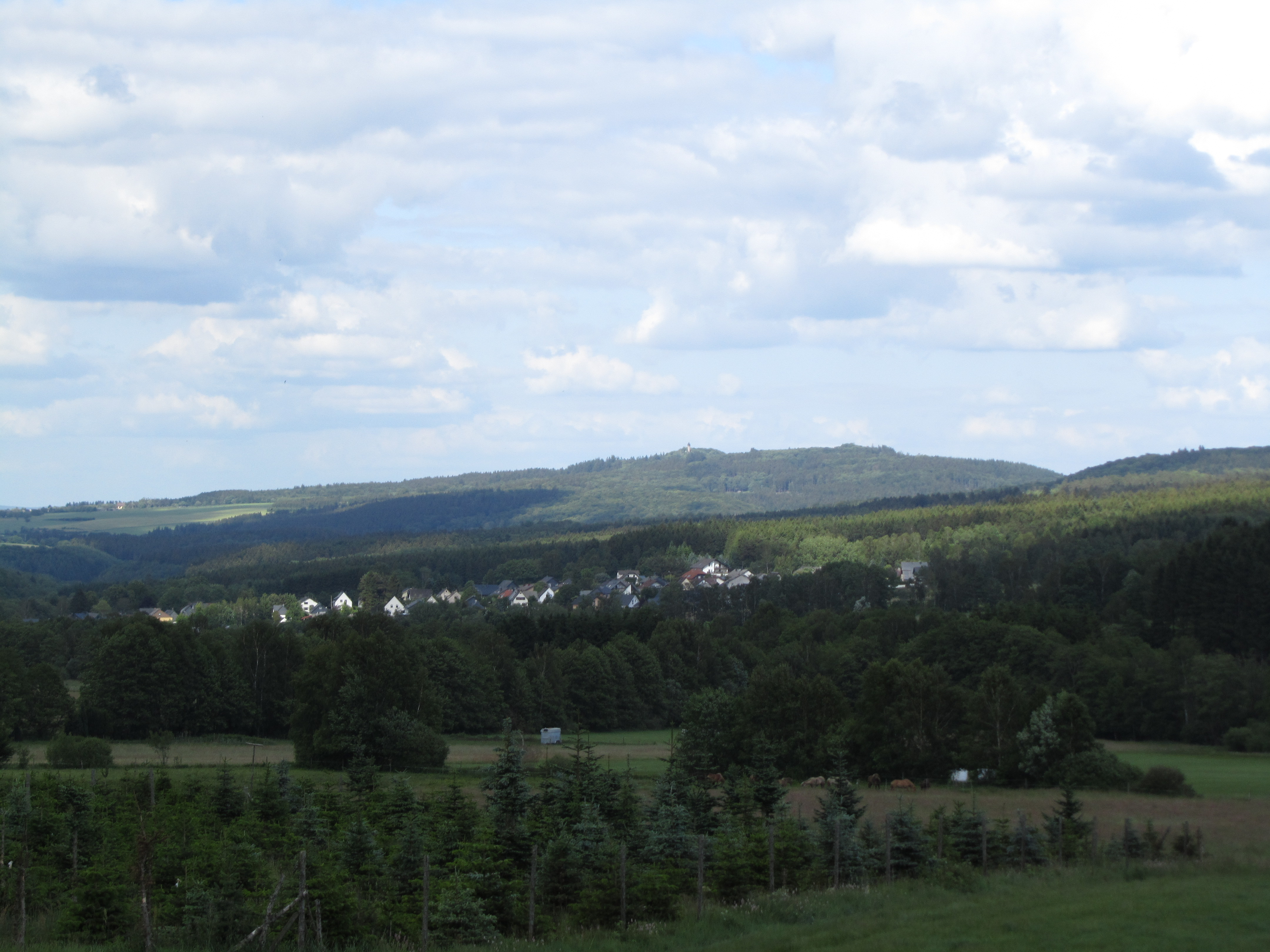
- The Wildenburger Kopf from the west-southwest.

Highest point
- Elevation: 664 m above sea level (NHN) (2,178 ft)
- Coordinates: 49°46′34″N 7°15′24″E

Geography
- Location within Rhineland-Palatinate
- Location: Rhineland-Palatinate, Germany
- Features: Wildenburg Castle and viewing tower
- Parent range: Idarwald, Hunsrück

The Wildenburger Kopf is a mountain that reaches a height of 664 m above sea level (NHN) in the Idar Forest in the Hunsrück mountains near the village of Kempfeld. There is a viewing tower at the summit which has been recently been built into the ruins of Wildenburg Castle. The Wildenburg Nature Reserve runs from the Wildenburger Kopf in a northeasterly direction along a rocky ridge.
