= Hunsrück-Hochwald National Park =

National Park in Rhineland-Palatinate, Germany

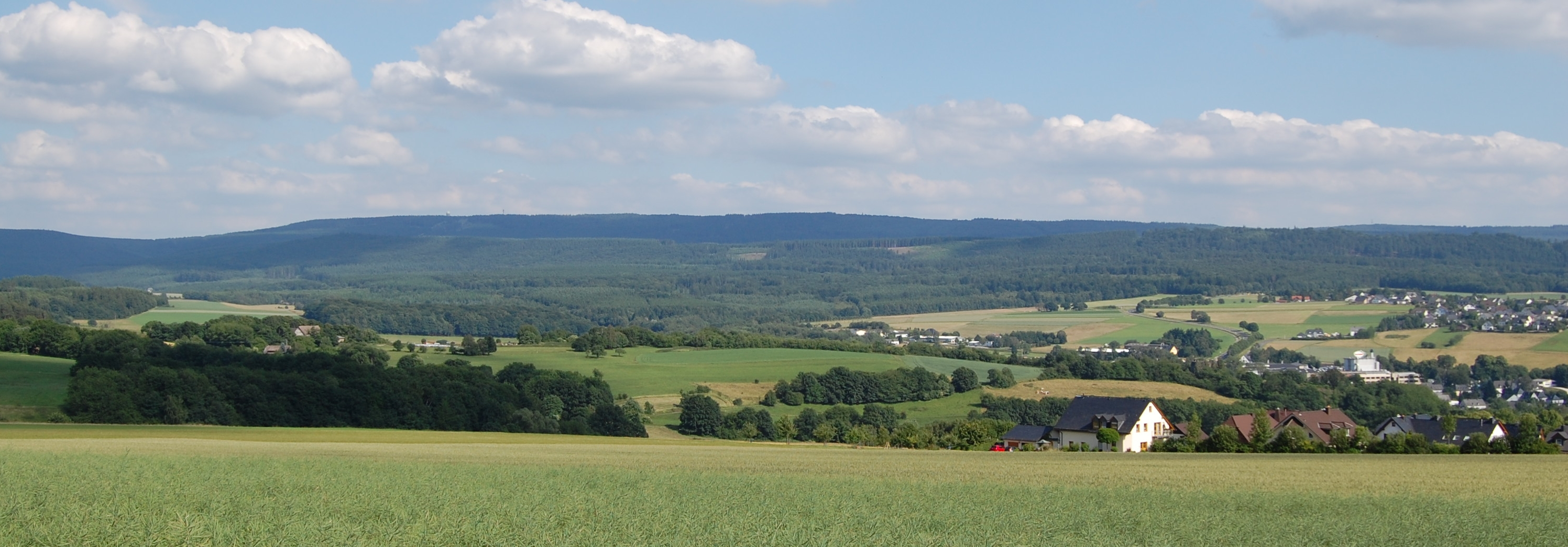
The Erbeskopf within the Hunsrück-Hochwald National Park

Hunsrück-Hochwald National Park (German: Nationalpark Hunsrück-Hochwald) is a national park located in the Hunsrück region of Rhineland-Palatinate and the Saarland in Germany. The park was established in March 2015 and is the country's newest national park, as well as the only one located in either of the two Bundesländer. The Park protects roughly 10,000 hectares of upland forests and fields.
