= Wildenburg Castle (Hunsrück) =

Wildenburg Castle Burg Wildenburg
- Kempfeld
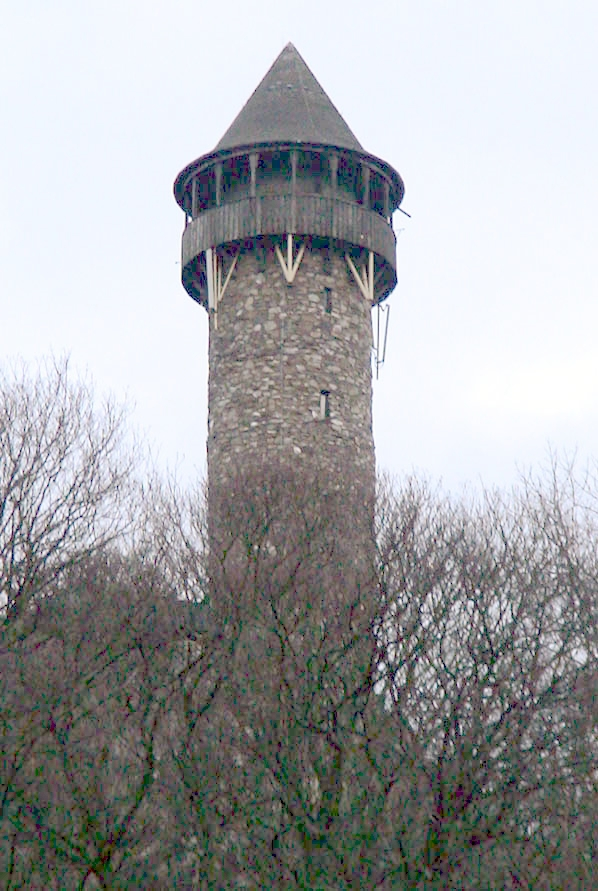
- The viewing tower on the castle ruins

Site information
- Type: motte-and-bailey castle
- Code: DE-RP
- Condition: ruin

Location
- Coordinates: 49°46′33″N 7°15′23″E
- Height: 630 m above sea level (NN)

Garrison information
- Occupants: counts

Wildenburg Castle (German: Burg Wildenburg) is a ruined castle near Kempfeld in the county of Birkenfeld in the German state of Rhineland-Palatinate.

== Location ==
The ruins lie in the Hunsrück mountains between the Idar Forest to the north and the town of Idar-Oberstein to the south at a height of about 630 metres above sea level (NN) on the Wildenburger Kopf above the valley of the Idarbach. It was the highest castle in the Hunsrück.

== History ==
The predecessor of the Wildenburg was probably a Celtic refuge fort with double ramparts from the La Tène period (ca. 450-50 B.C.). The Wildenburg rampart is one of a number of Celtic fortifications in southern Hunsrück between the hillfort of Otzenhausen, the Ringkopf, the Altburg and the Alteburg in Soonwaldsteig. A short section of the rampart has been reconstructed as a "Gallic Wall" (murus gallicus).

Around the year 350 A. D. a late Roman fort was established on the Wildenburg for a short time.

In the Late Middle Ages Wildenburg was built by the Wildgrafen family on the rocks at the western tip of the circular rampart. It was first mentioned in 1330 and was pillaged and destroyed by marauding troops from Lorraine in 1651. After being partially rebuilt in 1660, the lower ward of the castle acted as the administrative headquarters for the Amt of Wildenburg until the abolition of the county in the 1792.

== Description ==
Of the upper bailey (Oberburg) that was built on rocks only a few wall remains have survived. However, in 1980, a 22-metre-high observation tower was built on the top of the rocks that was opened in 1981.

In 1859 the buildings of lower bailey (Unterburg), including the gate tower, domestic buildings and enceinte, were restored for the Prussian Forestry Commission. These buildings were further converted into the present-day castle cafe and headquarters of the Hunsrück Club.

== Literature ==
- Alexander Thon, Stefan Ulrich und Achim Wendt: Burgen im Hunsrück und an der Nahe. "... wo trotzig noch ein mächtiger Thurm herabschaut. Schnell & Steiner, Regensburg, 2013, ISBN 978-3-7954-2493-0, pp. 160-163.
- Hans Nortmann: "Wildenburg": Archäologischer Rundweg. In: Rheinisches Landesmuseum Trier (publ.): Führer zu archäologischen Denkmälern des Trierer Landes. Trier, 2008, ISBN 978-3-923319-73-2 (Schriftenreihe des Rheinischen Landesmuseums Trier 35) pp. 128f.
- U. Heidrich: Geschichte der Wildenburg und ihrer Umgebung. Bad Kreuznach, 1906.
