= Beuren, Trier-Saarburg =

Beuren
- Municipality
- Coat of arms

- Location of Beuren within Trier-Saarburg district
- Interactive map of Beuren
- Location within Germany Location within Rhineland-Palatinate
- Coordinates: 49°44′N 6°52′E
- Country: Germany
- State: Rhineland-Palatinate
- District: Trier-Saarburg
- Municipal assoc.: Hermeskeil

Government
  - Mayor (2019–24): Petra Adams-Philippi

Area
  - Total: 18.5 km^{2} (7.1 sq mi)
- Elevation: 545 m (1,788 ft)

Population (2025-12-31)
  - Total: 936
  - Density: 50.6/km^{2} (131/sq mi)
- Time zone: UTC+01:00 (CET)
  - Summer (DST): UTC+02:00 (CEST)
- Postal codes: 54413
- Dialling codes: 06586
- Vehicle registration: TR
- Website: www.beuren-hochwald.de

Beuren (German pronunciation: [ˈbɔʏʁən]) is a municipality in the Trier-Saarburg district, in Rhineland-Palatinate, Germany.
