= Bettina Brück =

German politician (born 1967)

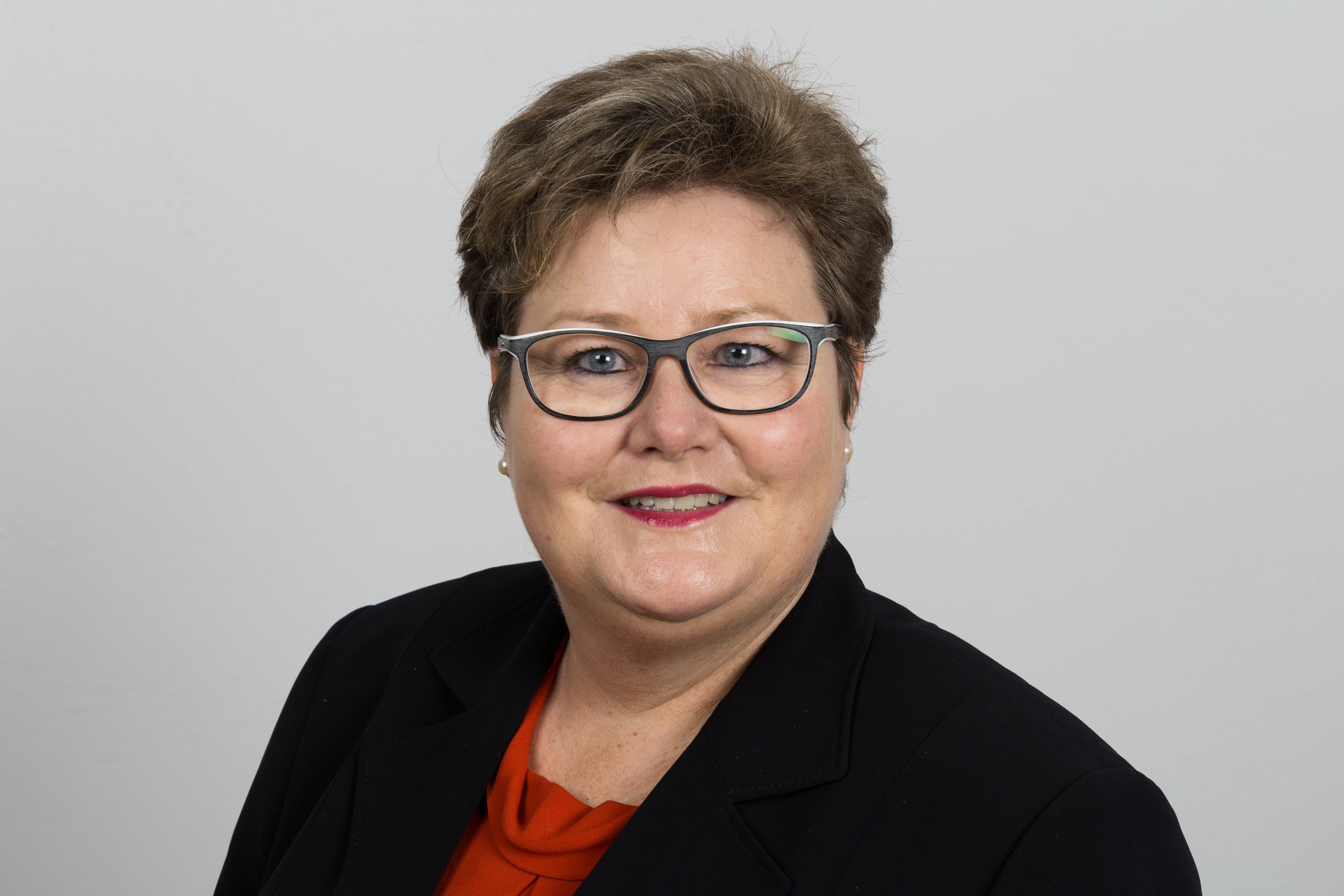
- Brück in 2016

Member of the Landtag of Rhineland-Palatinate
- In office 18 May 2006 – 18 May 2021
- Succeeded by: Tamara Müller

Personal details
- Born: 6 November 1967 (age 58) Hermeskeil
- Party: Social Democratic Party (since 1992)

Bettina Brück (born 6 November 1967 in Hermeskeil) is a German politician of the Social Democratic Party who served as state secretary of education of Rhineland-Palatinate from 2021 to 2026. From 2006 to 2021, she was a member of the Landtag of Rhineland-Palatinate.
