= Berthold-Bezelin =

German noble family

The Berthold-Bezelins (German: Berthold/Bezeline) were a German noble family from the 10th century, whose sphere of influence and property laid about the Trechirgau and Maifeldgau. They were the Counts of Stromberg before that county became a part of the Electorate of the Palatinate. The family is named after the prevailing first name Berthold, and its variation Bezelin. The Berthold-Bezelins supposedly descended from the Ernestiner (Counts of Sualafeld) and through them from the Luitpoldinger Dukes of Bavaria as a junior lineage.

== Genealogy ==
The reconstructed genealogy by D. C. Jackman reads

- a. Ernst II/IV (Ernestiner), m. N.N., sister of Erenfried II of the House of the Ezzonen
  - b1. Berthold I, Count in Maifeldgau and Trechirgau (fl. 966), m. Alberada, granddaughter of Eberhard (II) of Maienfeld (d. ca. 944) of the House of the Matfridinger
    - c1. Bezelin or Berthold II, Count in Maifeldgau and Trechirgau (d. 1010)
      - d1. Berthold III, Count in Maifeldgau and Trechirgau (d. 1043?), Count in Wetterau, successor of Otto of Hammerstein, m. N.N. of the House of the Ezzonen
        - e1. Berthold IV, Count in Maifeldgau and Trechirgau (d. 1075/81), 1064 Count ca. Wetterau/Maingau
        - e2. Udo, 1040 Count
        - e3. Ezzo, 1048 Count in Niddagau
        - e4. Kunigunde, m. Emich IV, Count in Nahegau (Emichones)
          - f1. Berthold I of Nürings, heir to jurisdiction of Niddagau and Wetterau
        - e5. N.N., m. Stephan I, Count of Sponheim, heirs to some jurisdiction of Trechirgau and Maifeldgau (Sponheimer)
    - c2. Gerlach, Count of Lower Lahngau, 1013 Count in Maingau (founder of the House of Diez)

Jackman cites Berthold of Ham (d. 1101), advocate of Prüm and documented with the Vianden cognomen, as a probable scion of this family and founder of the House of Vianden, a Sponheim branch.

== Literature ==
- Jackman, Donald C. Stromburg. Medieval German Counties. Medieval Prosopography. http://www.enlaplage.com/prosop/counts/countyA/county85.htm
