= Emichones =

Medieval German family

The Emichones (German: Emichonen) were an early medieval family in the southwestern German region. Its members were counts (Gaugrafen) in the Nahegau, perhaps as undercounts of the Salian dynasty. The conventional name Emichones is due to the prevailing first name "Emich". Several later families may trace their origins to the Emichones.

== History ==
The Nahegau was next to the Wormsgau and Speyergau, a possession of the Salian dynasty. In 940 Emich, a vassal of Count Conrad der Rote, received goods from Hadamar of Fulda in the Wormsgau. This Emich is probably related to the Counts of Leiningen, although it is dubious, whether he belongs to the Emichones family because of a lack of primary source documents.

Secure evidence for the Emichones appears in 961. A count and knight Emich received through a sentence according to Frankish law the possessions which until then had belonged to the Lords Lantbert, Megingoz and Reginzo, including Kirn and Bergen. These lords were supposedly sons of Nortbold, one of the first proprietors of a castle mentioned in 926, possibly the Schmidtburg.

Counts with the name Emich are documented without interval between 960 and 1065. Even so, a precise genealogy has hitherto not been organized.

The Count of Nahegau Emich IV supposedly married before 1072 Kunigunde, the sister of the Count of Trechirgau Berthold, the latter the founder of the Abbey of Ravengiersburg. The family of the Bertholds (or a branch of this family) died out with him. Emich V left around 1091 the title of Gaugraf behind and named himself Count of Flonheim in 1098 and Count of Schmidtburg in 1107, therefore ending the history of the Emichones, with the family dividing itself into the Wildgraves, Raugraves and Counts of Veldenz. A Berthold of Stromberg was apparently the brother of Emich V, a member of a collateral branch of the Emichones residing at the castle Stromburg and Vogt of Ravengiersburg.

== Structure ==
1. Counts of Veldenz
2. Wildgraves
3. Raugraves
4. (supposedly) Counts of Leiningen (first line Alt-Leiningen)

According to various theories the Counts of Sponheim also descended from the Emichones on the male side.

== Literature ==
- (in German) Crollius, Georg Christian: Vorlesung: Von dem ersten geschlecht der alten graven von Veldenz und dessen gemeinschaftlichen abstammung mit den ältern Wildgraven von den graven im Nohgau. Historia et Commentationes. Academiae Electoralis Scientiarvm et Elegantiorvm Litterarvm Theodoro-Palatinae. Mannhemii Typis Academicis 1770 (complete at Google Books)
- (in German) Dotzauer, Winfried: Geschichte des Nahe-Hunsrück-Raumes von den Anfängen bis zur Französischen Revolution, Franz Steiner Verlag, Stuttgart 2001
