= Grimburg =

- Municipality
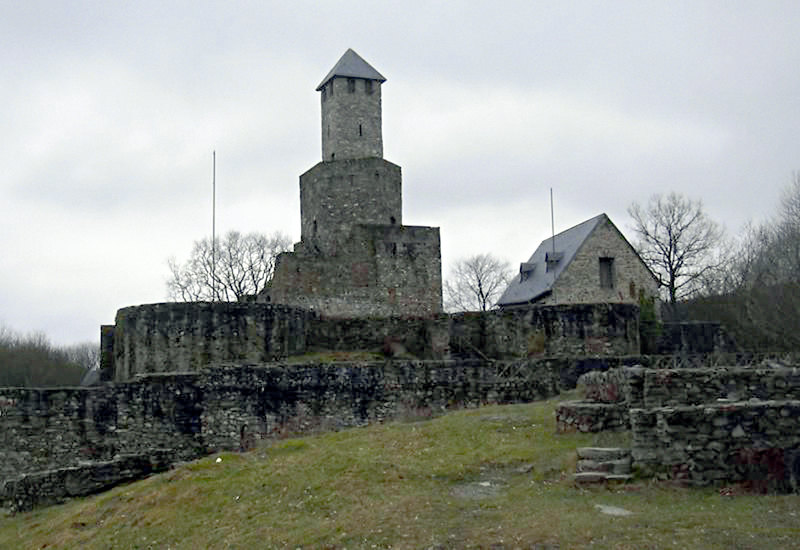

- Coat of arms

- Location of Grimburg within Trier-Saarburg district
- Interactive map of Grimburg
- Location within Germany Location within Rhineland-Palatinate
- Coordinates: 49°37′22″N 6°53′04″E
- Country: Germany
- State: Rhineland-Palatinate
- District: Trier-Saarburg
- Municipal assoc.: Hermeskeil

Government
  - Mayor (2023–29): Armand Seil

Area
  - Total: 10.18 km^{2} (3.93 sq mi)
- Elevation: 460 m (1,510 ft)

Population (2025-12-31)
  - Total: 449
  - Density: 44.1/km^{2} (114/sq mi)
- Time zone: UTC+01:00 (CET)
  - Summer (DST): UTC+02:00 (CEST)
- Postal codes: 54413
- Dialling codes: 06589
- Vehicle registration: TR

Grimburg is a municipality in the Trier-Saarburg district, in Rhineland-Palatinate, Germany.
