= Tamara Müller =

German politician (born 1989)

Member of the Landtag of Rhineland-Palatinate
- In office 18 May 2021 – 18 May 2026
- Preceded by: Bettina Brück

Personal details
- Born: 28 December 1989 (age 36) Bernkastel-Kues
- Party: Social Democratic Party (since 2007)

Tamara Müller (born 28 December 1989 in Bernkastel-Kues) is a German politician serving as state secretary of science, higher education and health of Rhineland-Palatinate since 2026. From 2021 to 2026, she was a member of the Landtag of Rhineland-Palatinate.
