= Natural National Landscapes =

National Natural Landscapes is an umbrella label which reunites all protected areas in Germany since 2005. At the moment there are 14 national parks, 16 biosphere reserves and 101 nature parks in Germany.

The protected areas are a valuable part of the German nation. Their wilderness is in danger due to the high population rates and its consequences (pollution, destruction of wildlife habitats). It is important to protect these natural areas as they contain wild animals, some which are endangered species, and many elements of the German culture are found in these areas. However, since nature protection laws differ from state to state, it is important to have an efficient approach to achieve this goal. This is why Nationale Naturlandschaften e.V., a non-profit organization, has developed the label National Natural Landscapes in Germany. The development of its corporate design was a long process due to the individuality of every park and reserve.

== Programmes ==
Nationale Naturlandschaften e.V. intensifies the work in and image of National Natural Landscapes through different programmes. Some are mentioned in the following:

- Affair of honour: Nature – Volunteers in Parks (Ehrensache Natur - Freiwillige in Parks)

Volunteers are active in many national natural landscapes, as they work alongside the rangers. They all have the common goal of protecting valuable ecosystems, plants and animals. The programme invites everyone, regardless of the age, qualification and how much time they have. This is a possibility for nature fans to experience Germany’s natural landscapes.

- Junior Rangers

The Junior Rangers’ goal is to create a bond between children and National Natural Landscapes in Germany. The programme strives to gain small ambassadors of global nature protection. The children, from ages seven to twelve, are assisted by rangers or certified educators while they explore the parks and learn about values and responsibilities that are implicated in nature, follow tracks of wild animals, learn about the area’s history and economic conditions and can help rangers do their work.

- Work Experience for the Environment (Praktikum für die Umwelt)

Students have the chance to attain work experience in nature in the protected areas all over Germany for a semester thanks to the collaboration between Nationale Naturlandschaften e.V. and the Commerzbank. The participants have the chance to support sustainable development as a trendsetting type of education in different areas in the subjects environment, economy and politics.

== See also ==
- European Landscape Convention
