= Ravengiersburg =

- Municipality
- Location of Ravengiersburg within Rhein-Hunsrück-Kreis district
- Interactive map of Ravengiersburg
- Location within Germany Location within Rhineland-Palatinate
- Coordinates: 49°56′13″N 7°28′41″E
- Country: Germany
- State: Rhineland-Palatinate
- District: Rhein-Hunsrück-Kreis
- Municipal assoc.: Simmern-Rheinböllen

Government
  - Mayor (2019–24): Klaus Spang

Area
  - Total: 6.16 km^{2} (2.38 sq mi)
- Elevation: 340 m (1,120 ft)

Population (2025-12-31)
  - Total: 329
  - Density: 53.4/km^{2} (138/sq mi)
- Time zone: UTC+01:00 (CET)
  - Summer (DST): UTC+02:00 (CEST)
- Postal codes: 55471
- Dialling codes: 06761
- Vehicle registration: SIM

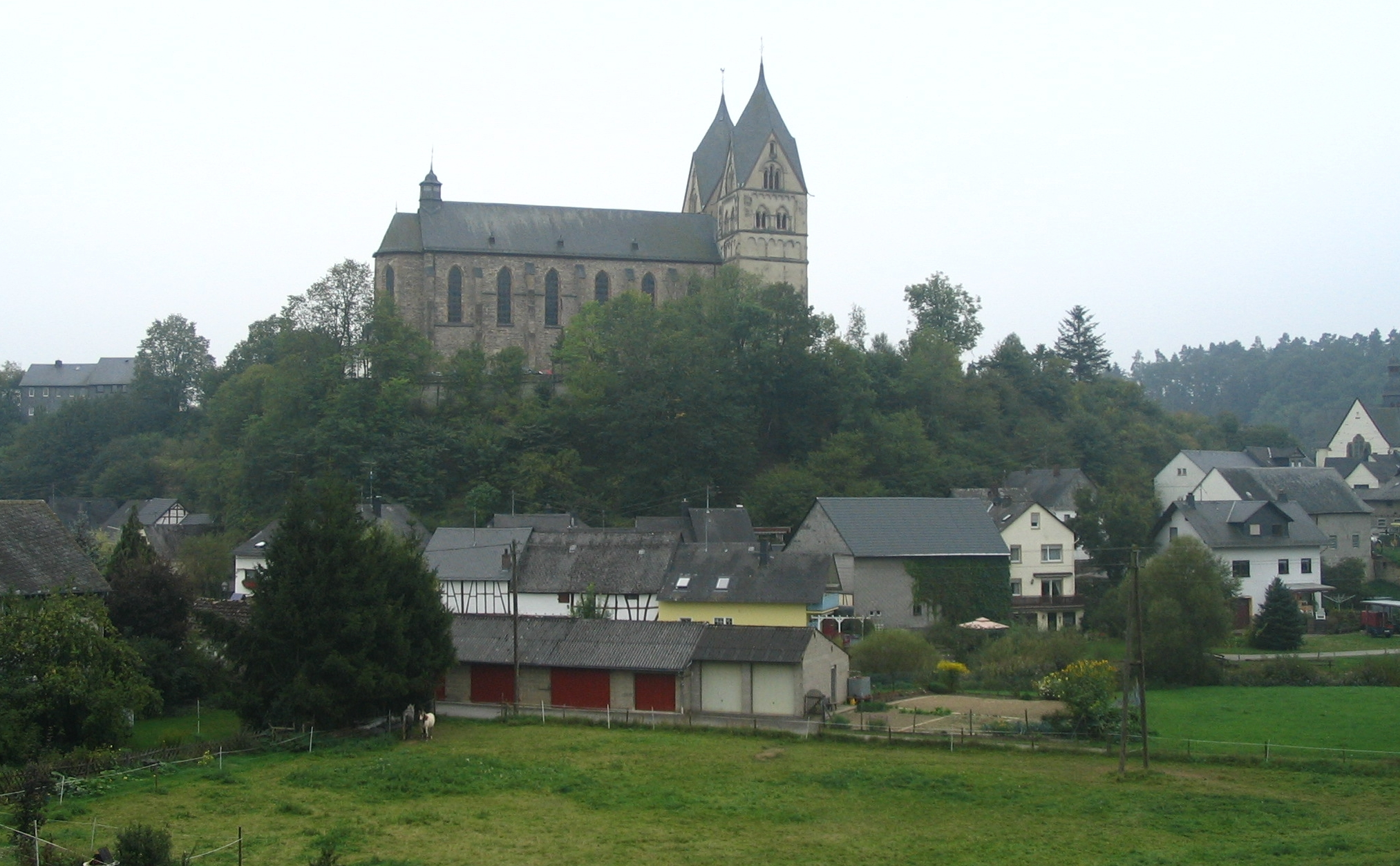
Hunsrückdom in Ravengiersburg

Ravengiersburg is an Ortsgemeinde – a municipality belonging to a Verbandsgemeinde, a kind of collective municipality – in the Rhein-Hunsrück-Kreis (district) in Rhineland-Palatinate, Germany. It belongs to the Verbandsgemeinde Simmern-Rheinböllen, whose seat is in Simmern. Ravengiersburg is home to the Hunsrückdom – the “Hunsrück Cathedral” – the former resident canonical foundation's church.

== Geography ==
=== Location ===
The municipality lies in the central Hunsrück in the Simmerbach valley, roughly 5 km east of Kirchberg and 6 km southwest of Simmern. The village's core gathers tightly around the monastery church. West of Ravengiersburg, the Kauerbach empties into the Simmerbach. The municipal area measures 6.16 km², of which 2.29 km² is wooded.

=== Constituent communities ===
Within Ravengiersburg's limits is an outlying hamlet named Neuhof.

== History ==
In 974, Ravengiersburg had its first documentary mention. The name comes from Count Rabangar, who in his time built a castle on the steep crags overlooking the Simmerbach. The founding of the Ravengiersburg Augustinian Canonical Foundation goes back to the year 1074. The monastery was founded on the site of the Salian castle of the Counts in the Trechirgau. In the document dealing with land donations to the monastery, the name Hunsruche – Hunsrück – is mentioned for the first time.

In 1410, the monastery and the village passed to the newly created Duchy of Palatinate-Simmern. The monastery grew up to become the greatest landowner between the Moselle and the Nahe. In 1564, however, when the Reformation was introduced into the duchy, the monastery was dissolved; several attempts to revive it all failed. In 1631, a definitive end was put to the Ravengiersburg Monastery in the Thirty Years' War when Swedish troops came and burnt it down. In 1673, the Electorate of Trier became the landholder. Charles III Philip, Elector Palatine had the church that still stands today built between 1718 and 1722. Beginning in 1794, Ravengiersburg lay under French rule. In 1814 it was assigned to the Kingdom of Prussia at the Congress of Vienna. Since 1946, it has been part of the then newly founded state of Rhineland-Palatinate.

== Politics ==
=== Municipal council ===
The council is made up of 8 council members, who were elected by majority vote at the municipal election held on 7 June 2009, and the honorary mayor as chairman.

=== Mayor ===
Ravengiersburg's mayor is Klaus Spang.

== Culture and sightseeing ==
=== Buildings ===
The following are listed buildings or sites in Rhineland-Palatinate’s Directory of Cultural Monuments:

- Former Augustinian canonical foundation (Ravengiersburg Monastery; see also below), Hauptstraße (monumental zone) – former foundation church, Saint Christopher’s Church, Baroque aisleless church, 1708-1711, Romanesque twin-tower façade, first fourth of the 12th century and first third of the 13th century; Baroque foundation building, extensively renovated in 1921; well hut, 18th century; former rectory, 1706; cross, marked ..43
- Evangelical church, Hauptstraße – Gothic Revival cruciform aisleless church, 1907/1908
- Hauptstraße 18 – timber-frame house, early 18th century, on solid basement pedestal, 16th century
- Wayside chapel, north of the village on Kreisstraße 58 – quarrystone building; Mary, two saints, earlier half of the 17th century

==== Ravengiersburg Monastery ====
Foremost among the municipality’s points of interest is the Monastery whose church, the St. Christophorus-Kirche (Saint Christopher’s) has a Romanesque twin-tower façade. This imposing church is also called the Hunsrückdom (“Hunsrück Cathedral”), although it is not actually a cathedral.

=== Clubs ===
Active clubs include Ravenger e.V. für Brauchstumpflege (for fostering customs), an angling club and HSV 70 (a sport club). Until 2006, the Katholische Arbeitnehmer-Bewegung (KAB; “Catholic Employees’ Movement”) ran a great professional training operation in the monastery buildings. Also worth mentioning is the youth meeting centre, which has been running since 1978.
