= Bescheid =

- Municipality
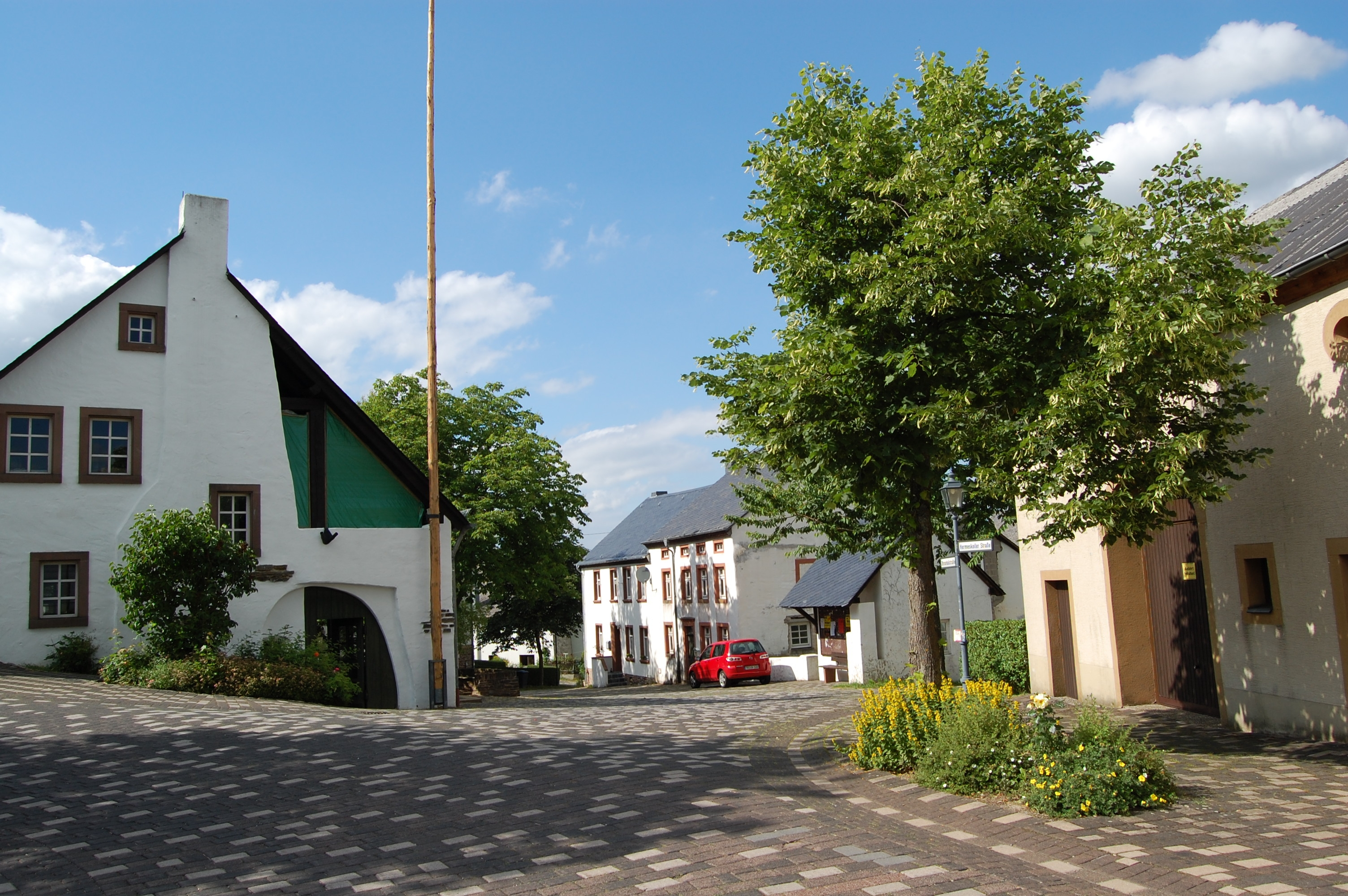

- Coat of arms

- Location of Bescheid within Trier-Saarburg district
- Interactive map of Bescheid
- Location within Germany Location within Rhineland-Palatinate
- Coordinates: 49°45′8″N 6°53′27″E
- Country: Germany
- State: Rhineland-Palatinate
- District: Trier-Saarburg
- Municipal assoc.: Hermeskeil

Government
  - Mayor (2019–24): Nastja Raabe

Area
  - Total: 7.62 km^{2} (2.94 sq mi)
- Elevation: 421 m (1,381 ft)

Population (2025-12-31)
  - Total: 390
  - Density: 51/km^{2} (130/sq mi)
- Time zone: UTC+01:00 (CET)
  - Summer (DST): UTC+02:00 (CEST)
- Postal codes: 54413
- Dialling codes: 06509
- Vehicle registration: TR
- Website: www.bescheid.de

Bescheid is a municipality in the Trier-Saarburg district, in Rhineland-Palatinate, Germany.
