= Hermeskeil =

- Town
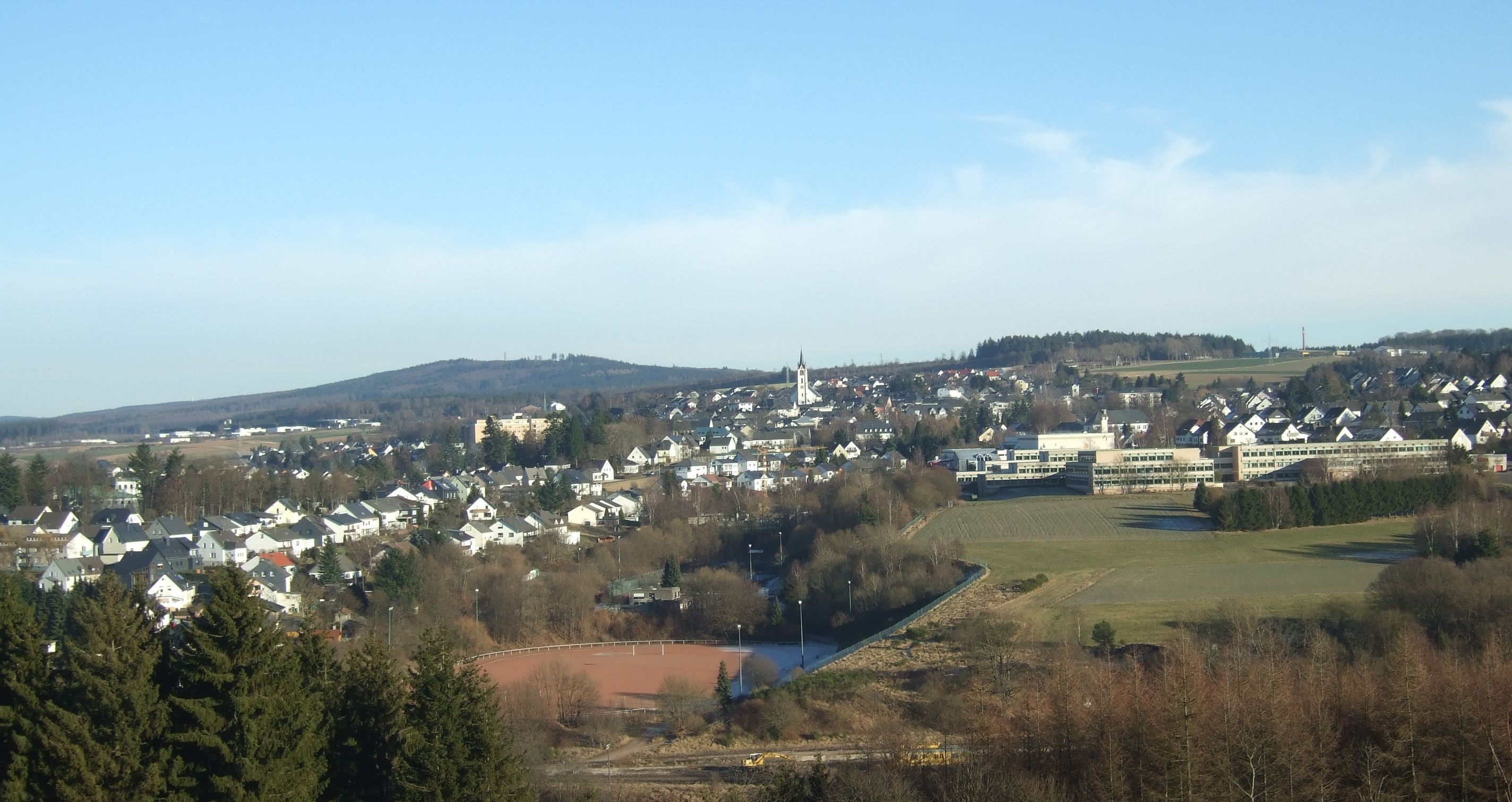

- Coat of arms

- Location of Hermeskeil within Trier-Saarburg district
- Interactive map of Hermeskeil
- Location within Germany Location within Rhineland-Palatinate
- Coordinates: 49°39′26″N 6°56′56″E
- Country: Germany
- State: Rhineland-Palatinate
- District: Trier-Saarburg
- Municipal assoc.: Hermeskeil
- Subdivisions: 3

Government
  - Mayor (2019–24): Lena Weber (SPD)

Area
  - Total: 30.89 km^{2} (11.93 sq mi)
- Elevation: 540 m (1,770 ft)

Population (2025-12-31)
  - Total: 6,501
  - Density: 210.5/km^{2} (545.1/sq mi)
- Time zone: UTC+01:00 (CET)
  - Summer (DST): UTC+02:00 (CEST)
- Postal codes: 54411
- Dialling codes: 06503
- Vehicle registration: TR
- Website: www.hermeskeil.de

Hermeskeil (German pronunciation: [ˈhɛʁməskaɪl]) is a town in the Trier-Saarburg district, in Rhineland-Palatinate, Germany. It is situated in the Hunsrück, approx. 25 km southeast of Trier. Its population is about 5,900.

== Data ==
Hermeskeil is the seat of the Verbandsgemeinde ("collective municipality") Hermeskeil.

The old locomotive depot, Bahnbetriebswerk Hermeskeil is now a museum housing German steam engines.

The Flugausstellung aircraft museum displays more than 100 aircraft and is the largest private museum of that kind in Europe.

A Gaulish burial of the 1st century AD was discovered in a field near Hermeskeil in 2009.

A Roman castrum has been identified in 2015: it is the only castrum created by Julius Caesar inside Magna Germania, when he crossed the Rhine river in 53 BC

== Notable people ==
- Bettina Brück (born 1967), German politician
- Shida Bazyar (born 1988), German writer

== Wikipedia links ==
- (in German) Link to German page Hermeskeil
- (in German) Link to information page about Flugausstellung aircraft museum
- (in German) de:Römerlager Hermeskeil
