= Flugausstellung Peter Junior =

Coordinates: 49°41′7″N 6°57′39″E

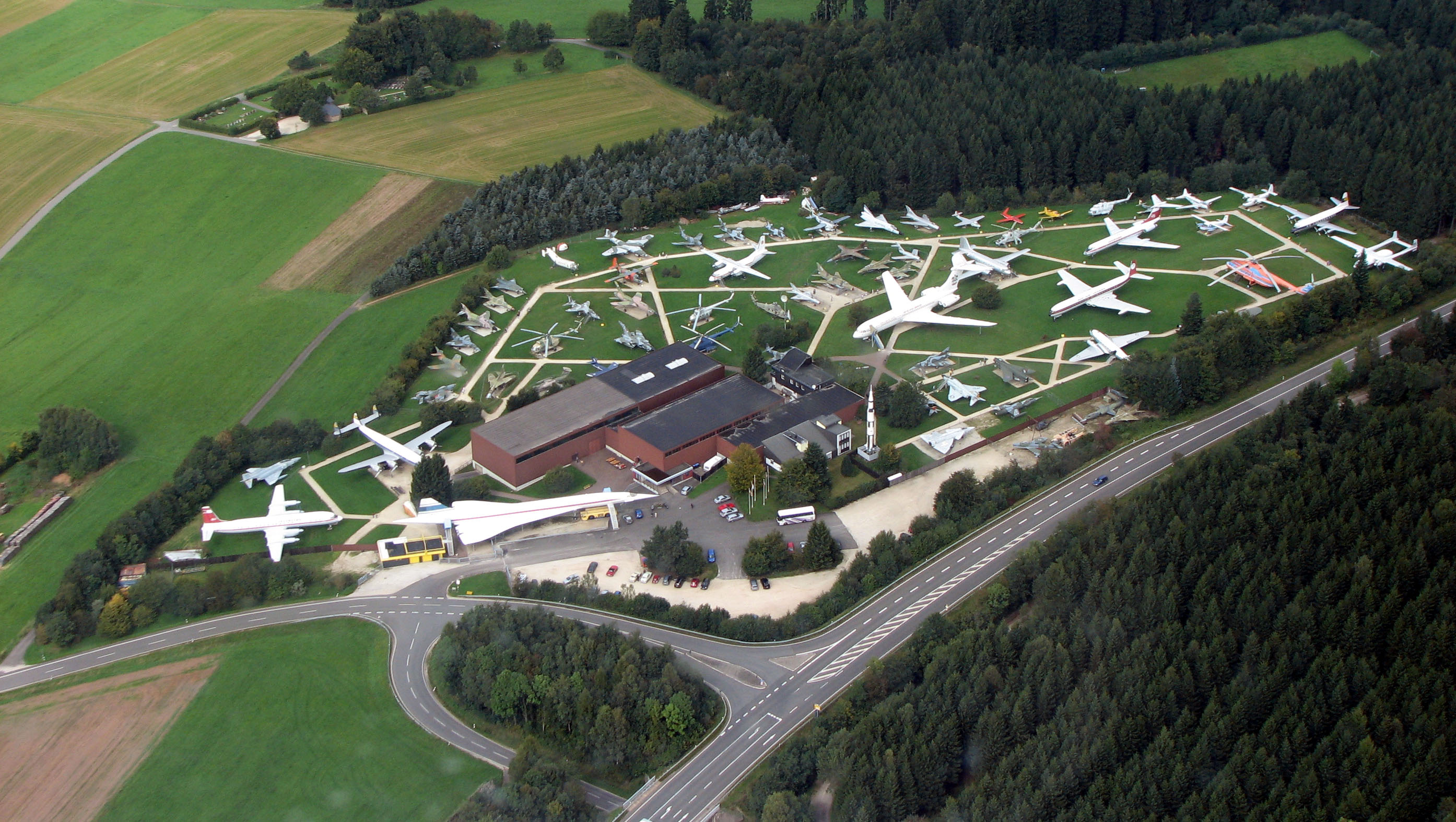
- Aerial photograph of the museum
- Established: 1973
- Location: Hermeskeil, Rhineland-Palatinate
- Type: Aviation museum
- Website: http://www.flugausstellung.de/

The Flugausstellung Peter Junior, previously the Flugausstellung Hermeskeil, is a private aviation museum in the town of Hermeskeil in the German state of Rhineland-Palatinate.

The museum opened in July 1973 in several buildings with a covered area of over 3,600 square meters. Today, it is home to over 100 civilian and military aircraft displayed on a 76,000 square meter site.

== Collection ==
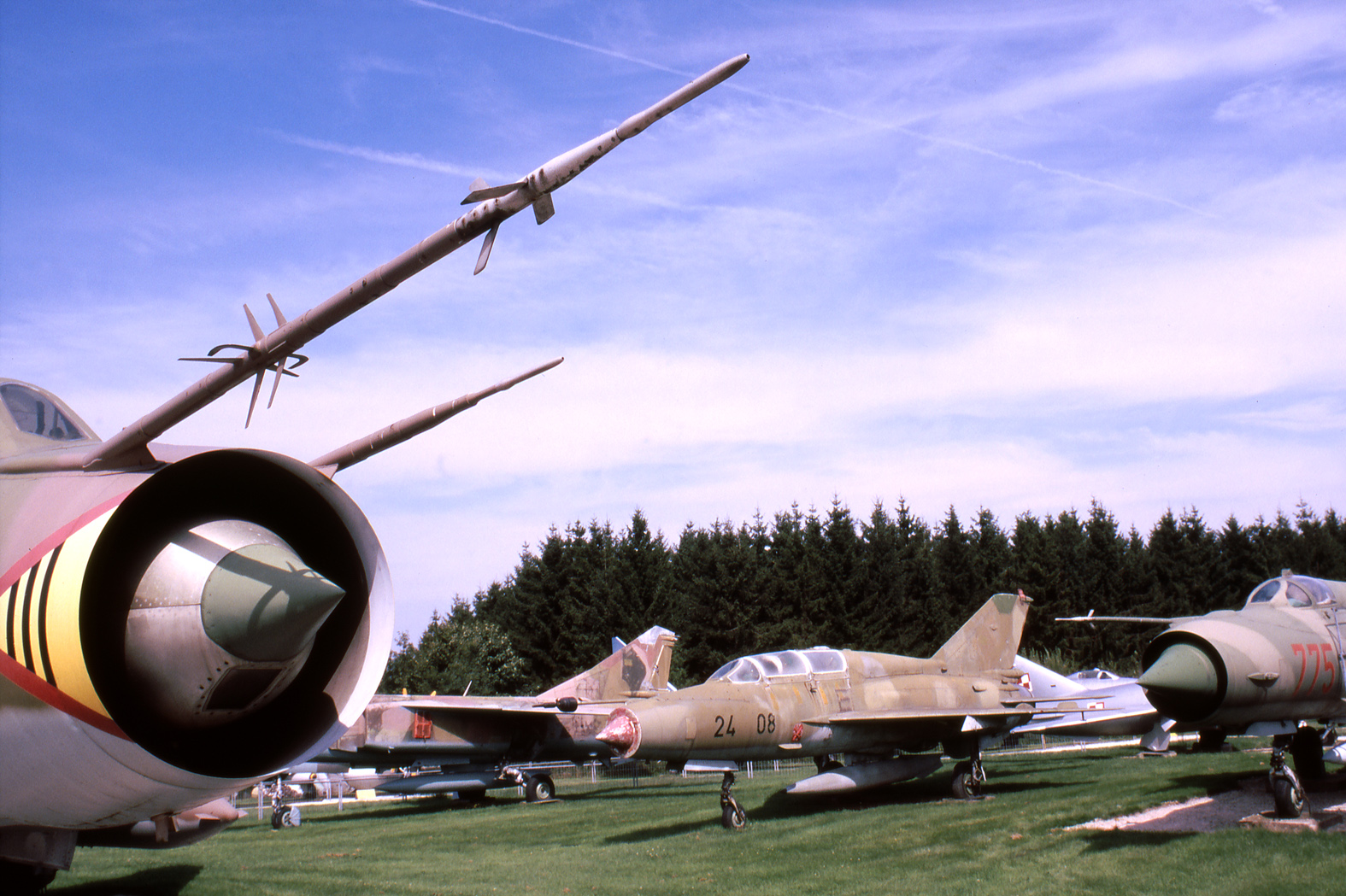
Sukhoi Su-22, MiG-23 and two MiG-21s.

- Aérospatiale SE 3130 Alouette II M-234
- Aérospatiale SE 3130 Alouette II V-248
- Antonov An-2T 16247310
- Antonov An-26 52+08
- Aero L-39 Albatross 28+30
- Bell UH-1D Iroquois 72+31
- Blériot XI
- Boeing-Stearman PT-18 40-1964
- Brantly B-2 93
- Bristol Sycamore 78+33
- Canadair Sabre JC+101
- CASA 2.111 BR.2I-14
- CASA 352L T.2B-127
- Concorde – replica
- Convair F-102 Delta Dagger 56-1125
- Dassault Mirage IIIR 310
- Dassault Mirage V BA-35/54
- Dassault Super Mystère B.2
- de Havilland Dove XJ348
- de Havilland Comet 4C G-BDIW
- de Havilland Venom FB.4 J-1797
- Dornier Alpha Jet 40+61
- Dornier Do 27A-1 56+53
- Dornier Do 28D-2 4050
- Douglas C-47A Skytrain 42-100997
- English Electric Lightning F.2A XN782
- English Electric Canberra B(I).8 XM264
- F+W C-3605 C-541
- Fairey Gannet XL450
- Fiat G.91R/3 MM5257
- Fiat G.91R/3 30+86
- FAG Stettin La.11 Landmann – replica
- Fokker Dr.I – replica
- Focke Hartz FoHa 1 80
- Fouga CM.170 Magister 93+03
- Fouga CM.170 Magister 410
- Grade monoplane
- Handley Page Jetstream T.2 XX476
- Hawker Sea Hawk FGA.6 XE327
- Hawker Hunter F.6A XF418
- Hawker Hunter Mk.58 J-4098
- Hawker Siddeley Harrier GR.3 XZ998
- Horten XVc
- Hütter H-17B
- Hunting Percival Jet Provost XE670
- Ilyushin Il-14P 14803076
- Ilyushin Il-18D DDR-STH
- Kamov Ka-26 7404609
- LET Z-37 Čmelák D-ESSJ
- Lockheed T-33A 94+39
- Lockheed T-33A 95+17
- Lockheed F-104G Starfighter FX60
- Lockheed F-104G Starfighter 20+43
- Lockheed F-104G Starfighter 26+61
- Lockheed RF-104G Starfighter 24+91
- Lockheed Super Constellation D-ALIN
- Lilienthal Normalsegelapparat – replica
- MBB Bo 105CB S-133
- MBB Bo 105P 87+08
- McDonnell Douglas F-4C Phantom II 63-7421
- McDonnell Douglas F-4C Phantom II 63-7583
- McDonnell Douglas RF-4C Phantom II 68-0587
- Mikoyan-Gurevich MiG-15UTI
- Mikoyan-Gurevich MiG-17F
- Mikoyan-Gurevich MiG-21F-13 741217
- Mikoyan-Gurevich MiG-21SPS 22+36
- Mikoyan-Gurevich MiG-21SPSK
- Mikoyan-Gurevich MiG-21MF 23+44
- Mikoyan-Gurevich MiG-21US 24+08
- Mikoyan-Gurevich MiG-21bis 24+24
- Mikoyan-Gurevich MiG-23MF 20+01
- Mikoyan-Gurevich MiG-23BN 20+46
- Mikoyan-Gurevich MiG-23ML 20+19
- Mil Mi-1M W401031
- Mil Mi-2 543620074
- Mil Mi-2 562945063
- Mil Mi-4A 02139
- Mil Mi-6A 715309B
- Mil Mi-8T 94+20
- Mil Mi-9 93+95
- Mil Mi-14PL 95+02
- Mil Mi-24P 96+50
- Nord 1002 Pingouin II 91
- Nord Noratlas 52+56
- North American F-100F Super Sabre 56-4014/56-3944
- North American AT-6F Texan 44-81778
- North American Rockwell OV-10B Bronco 99+16
- Panavia Tornado XX948
- Percival Pembroke C.54 54+21
- Percival Pembroke C.54 54+24
- Piasecki H-21C Shawnee 83+11
- Piper J3C Cub
- Raab Doppelraab IV 254
- Republic F-84F Thunderstreak BF+105
- Republic F-84F Thunderstreak DE+254
- Republic RF-84F Thunderflash EB+341
- Republic F-105F Thunderchief 62-4417
- Santos-Dumont Demoiselle – replica
- Saab S35E Draken 35931
- Saab ASJF37 Viggen 374974
- Scheibe L-Spatz 55 724
- Scheibe Mü 13 E Bergfalke II 2
- Schleicher Ka-4 Rhönlerche II 211
- SEPECAT Jaguar GR.1 XX955
- Sikorsky S-64 Skycrane
- Sukhoi Su-7B 5309
- Sukhoi Su-22M4 25+16
- Tupolev Tu-134A DDR-SCK
- Westland Wasp HAS.1 XS569
- Westland Whirlwind HAR.10 XD186
- Westland Whirlwind HAR.10 XP352
- Westland Wessex HC.2 XR527
- Westland Wessex HC.2 XT670
- Westland Scout XR633
- Westland Sioux AH.1 XT548
- Vickers VC10 G-ARVF
- Vickers Viscount D-ANAM
- Vinten Vi 122 UMA-01

== See also ==
- List of aerospace museums
