= Damflos =

- Municipality
- Coat of arms

- Location of Damflos within Trier-Saarburg district
- Interactive map of Damflos
- Location within Germany Location within Rhineland-Palatinate
- Coordinates: 49°40′6.12″N 6°59′0.97″E
- Country: Germany
- State: Rhineland-Palatinate
- District: Trier-Saarburg
- Municipal assoc.: Hermeskeil

Government
  - Mayor (2019–24): Joachim Wellenberg

Area
  - Total: 5.31 km^{2} (2.05 sq mi)
- Elevation: 570 m (1,870 ft)

Population (2025-12-31)
  - Total: 611
  - Density: 115/km^{2} (298/sq mi)
- Time zone: UTC+01:00 (CET)
  - Summer (DST): UTC+02:00 (CEST)
- Postal codes: 54413
- Dialling codes: 06503
- Vehicle registration: TR

Damflos is a municipality in the Trier-Saarburg district, in Rhineland-Palatinate, Germany.
