= Hinzert-Pölert =

- Municipality
- Coat of arms

- Location of Hinzert-Pölert within Trier-Saarburg district
- Interactive map of Hinzert-Pölert
- Location within Germany Location within Rhineland-Palatinate
- Coordinates: 49°42′18.8″N 6°54′6.40″E
- Country: Germany
- State: Rhineland-Palatinate
- District: Trier-Saarburg
- Municipal assoc.: Hermeskeil

Government
  - Mayor (2019–24): Mario Leiber

Area
  - Total: 4.85 km^{2} (1.87 sq mi)
- Elevation: 490 m (1,610 ft)

Population (2025-12-31)
  - Total: 272
  - Density: 56.1/km^{2} (145/sq mi)
- Time zone: UTC+01:00 (CET)
  - Summer (DST): UTC+02:00 (CEST)
- Postal codes: 54421
- Dialling codes: 06586
- Vehicle registration: TR
- Website: www.hinzert-poelert.de

Hinzert-Pölert is a municipality in the Trier-Saarburg district, in Rhineland-Palatinate, Germany. Just west of the village lies the former concentration camp Hinzert
