= Reinsfeld =

- Municipality
- Coat of arms

- Location of Reinsfeld within Trier-Saarburg district
- Interactive map of Reinsfeld
- Location within Germany Location within Rhineland-Palatinate
- Coordinates: 49°40′43″N 6°52′43″E
- Country: Germany
- State: Rhineland-Palatinate
- District: Trier-Saarburg
- Municipal assoc.: Hermeskeil

Government
  - Mayor (2019–24): Uwe Matthias Roßmann (SPD)

Area
  - Total: 19.77 km^{2} (7.63 sq mi)
- Elevation: 450–550 m (1,480–1,800 ft)

Population (2025-12-31)
  - Total: 2,454
  - Density: 124.1/km^{2} (321.5/sq mi)
- Time zone: UTC+01:00 (CET)
  - Summer (DST): UTC+02:00 (CEST)
- Postal codes: 54421
- Dialling codes: 06503
- Vehicle registration: TR
- Website: www.reinsfeld.de

Reinsfeld is a municipality in the Trier-Saarburg district, in Rhineland-Palatinate, Germany. It belongs to the municipality of Hermeskeil. Reinsfeld is a state-recognized health resort.
