= Trechirgau =

Administrative district

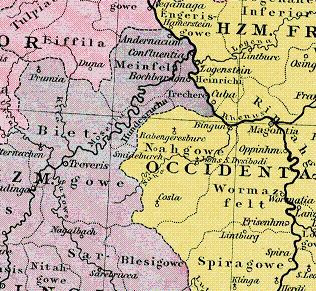
The Trechirgau ("Trechere") next to the Hundesrucha ca. 1000

The Trechirgau was a mediaeval administrative district, a gau. It belonged to the Duchy of Lorraine. Its exact extent is only roughly known and it lay in the triangle formed by Enkirch, Koblenz and Oberwesel.

== History ==
The Trechirgau was closely associated with the Maifeldgau. The main location lay in Treis on the Moselle. The district around Treis is known in documents as Trigorium. The gau was administered by counts. Documented as gau counts in the Trechirgau are the Berthold/Beceline, who became extinct at the end of the 11th century. The further history of the gau is not clear. Parts of it appear later in the possession of, among others, the Electorate of the Palatinate, the Counts of Virneburg, the Counts of Sponheim and of the Electorate of Trier.

== Literature ==
- Heinzelmann, Josef: Der Weg nach Trigorium …; in: Jahrbuch für westdeutsche Landesgeschichte 21 (1995), S. 91–132
