= Schwarzen =

- Municipality
- Coat of arms

- Location of Schwarzen within Rhein-Hunsrück-Kreis district
- Interactive map of Schwarzen
- Location within Germany Location within Rhineland-Palatinate
- Coordinates: 49°57′43″N 7°19′52″E
- Country: Germany
- State: Rhineland-Palatinate
- District: Rhein-Hunsrück-Kreis
- Municipal assoc.: Kirchberg

Government
  - Mayor (2019–24): Achim Rech

Area
  - Total: 3.88 km^{2} (1.50 sq mi)
- Elevation: 397 m (1,302 ft)

Population (2025-12-31)
  - Total: 143
  - Density: 36.9/km^{2} (95.5/sq mi)
- Time zone: UTC+01:00 (CET)
  - Summer (DST): UTC+02:00 (CEST)
- Postal codes: 55481
- Dialling codes: 06763
- Vehicle registration: SIM

Schwarzen (German pronunciation: [ˈʃvaʁtsn̩]) is an Ortsgemeinde – a municipality belonging to a Verbandsgemeinde, a kind of collective municipality – in the Rhein-Hunsrück-Kreis (district) in Rhineland-Palatinate, Germany. It belongs to the Verbandsgemeinde of Kirchberg, whose seat is in the like-named town.

== Geography ==
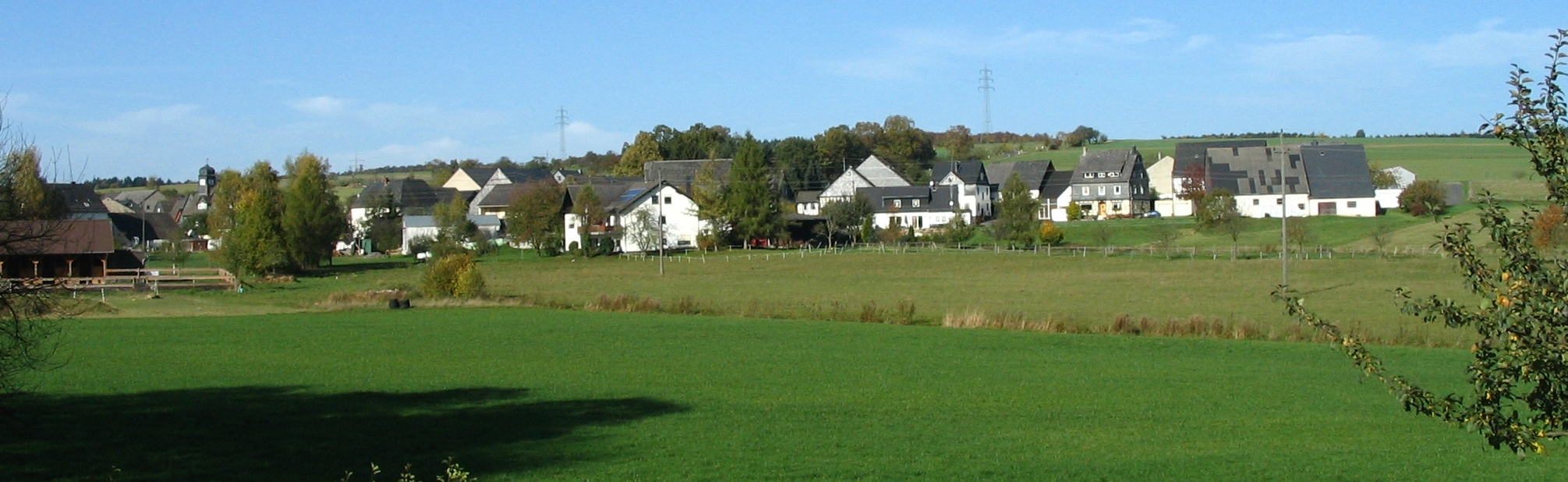
Schwarzen seen from the south

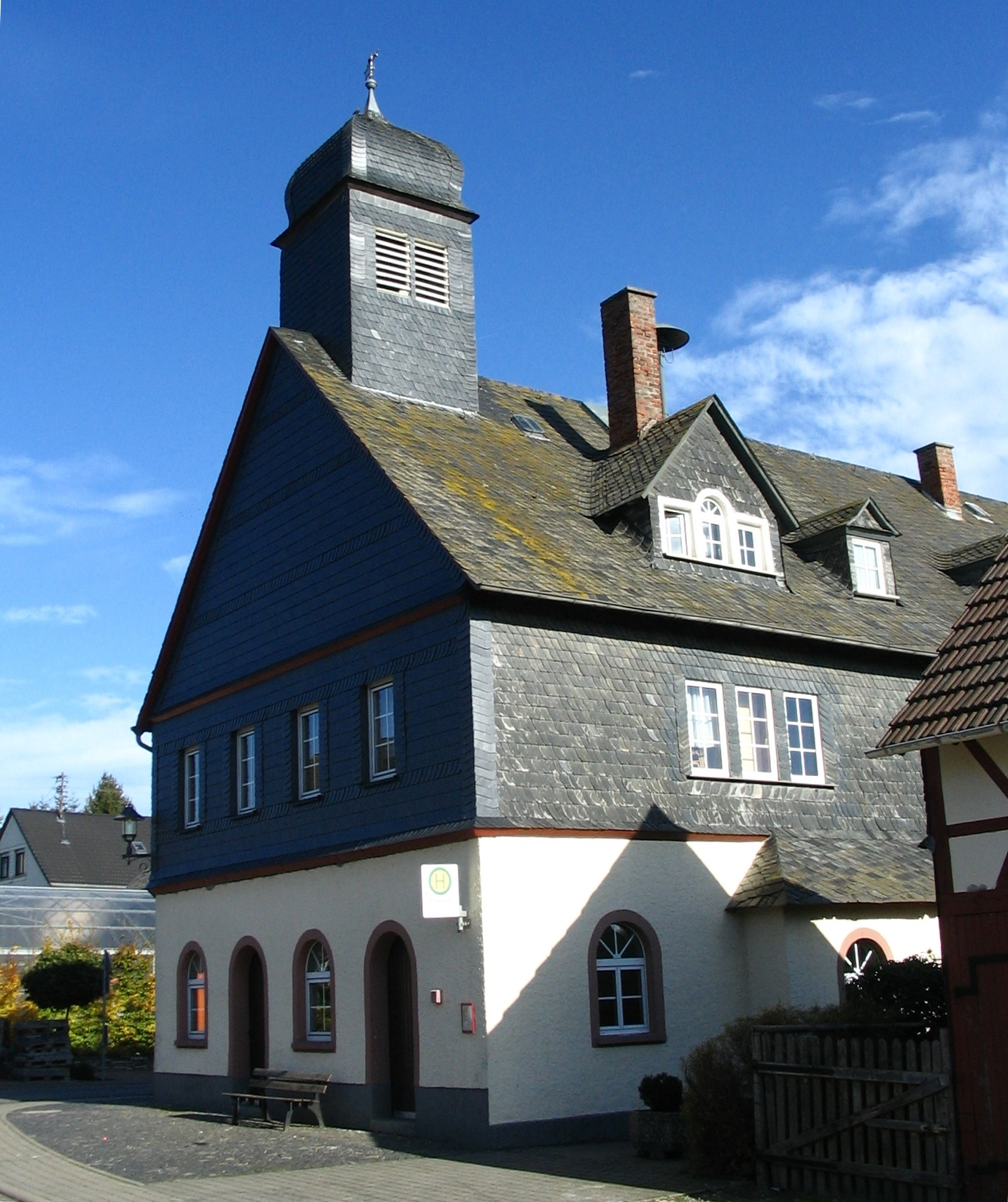
Municipal centre in the village centre

=== Location ===
The municipality lies in a dale in the central Hunsrück between the Hunsrückhöhenstraße (“Hunsrück Heights Road” – also called Bundesstraße 327 – a scenic road across the Hunsrück built originally as a military road on Hermann Göring’s orders) and Bundesstraße 50. Schwarzen lies roughly 5 km west-northwest of Kirchberg and the same distance northeast of Frankfurt-Hahn Airport.

=== Neighbouring municipalities ===
The following places are nearby (with distances in kilometres): Würrich (2), Ober Kostenz (2), Nieder Kostenz (4), Kappel (6), Kludenbach (6), Todenroth (8), Metzenhausen (10).

== History ==
prehistoric and protohistoric barrows can be found in the municipal forest (section 12) and the state forest (section 131). In the field known as “Hinter dem Sträßchen”, old foundations have been unearthed and hewn pieces of sandstone have been brought to light.

In 1259, Schwarzen had its first documentary mention in a document from Waldgrave Konrad and Count Gerlach of Veldenz. Beginning in 1794, Schwarzen lay under French rule. In 1815 it was assigned to the Kingdom of Prussia at the Congress of Vienna. Since 1946, it has been part of the then newly founded state of Rhineland-Palatinate. The municipality was the “Prettiest Village in the Rhein-Hunsrück-Kreis” in the 1998 contest.

== Politics ==
=== Municipal council ===
The council is made up of 6 council members, who were elected by majority vote at the municipal election held on 7 June 2009, and the honorary mayor as chairman.

=== Mayor ===
Schwarzen's mayor is Achim Rech.

=== Coat of arms ===
The German blazon reads: Gespalten durch eingeschweifte silberne Spitze, belegt mit einem blauen, rotbewehrt und -bezungten Löwen, vorn in Rot eine goldene Glocke, hinten in Grün ein goldener Pflug.

The municipality's arms might in English heraldic language be described thus: Tierced in mantle, dexter gules a bell Or, sinister vert a plough of the second and in base argent a lion rampant azure armed and langued of the first.

The lion refers to the Counts of Veldenz, who had an allodial holding in the village as early as 1257. The charge on the dexter (armsbearer's right, viewer's left) side, the bell, comes from a local folktale that tells of how monks from the Schwarzen Monastery kept their bells from being seized by the warring parties in the Thirty Years' War by putting them underwater in the brook. The plough on the sinister (armsbearer's left, viewer's right) side recalls agriculture, which over centuries was Schwarzen's livelihood.

== Culture and sightseeing ==
=== Buildings ===
The following are listed buildings or sites in Rhineland-Palatinate’s Directory of Cultural Monuments:

- Mühlenweg 2 – estate complex; slated timber-frame house, latter half of the 19th century, timber-frame barn
