= Nieder Kostenz =

- Municipality
- Coat of arms

- Location of Nieder Kostenz within Rhein-Hunsrück-Kreis district
- Interactive map of Nieder Kostenz
- Location within Germany Location within Rhineland-Palatinate
- Coordinates: 49°56′43″N 7°22′1″E
- Country: Germany
- State: Rhineland-Palatinate
- District: Rhein-Hunsrück-Kreis
- Municipal assoc.: Kirchberg

Government
  - Mayor (2019–24): Harald Gewehr

Area
  - Total: 4.12 km^{2} (1.59 sq mi)
- Elevation: 353 m (1,158 ft)

Population (2025-12-31)
  - Total: 190
  - Density: 46/km^{2} (120/sq mi)
- Time zone: UTC+01:00 (CET)
  - Summer (DST): UTC+02:00 (CEST)
- Postal codes: 55481
- Dialling codes: 06763
- Vehicle registration: SIM

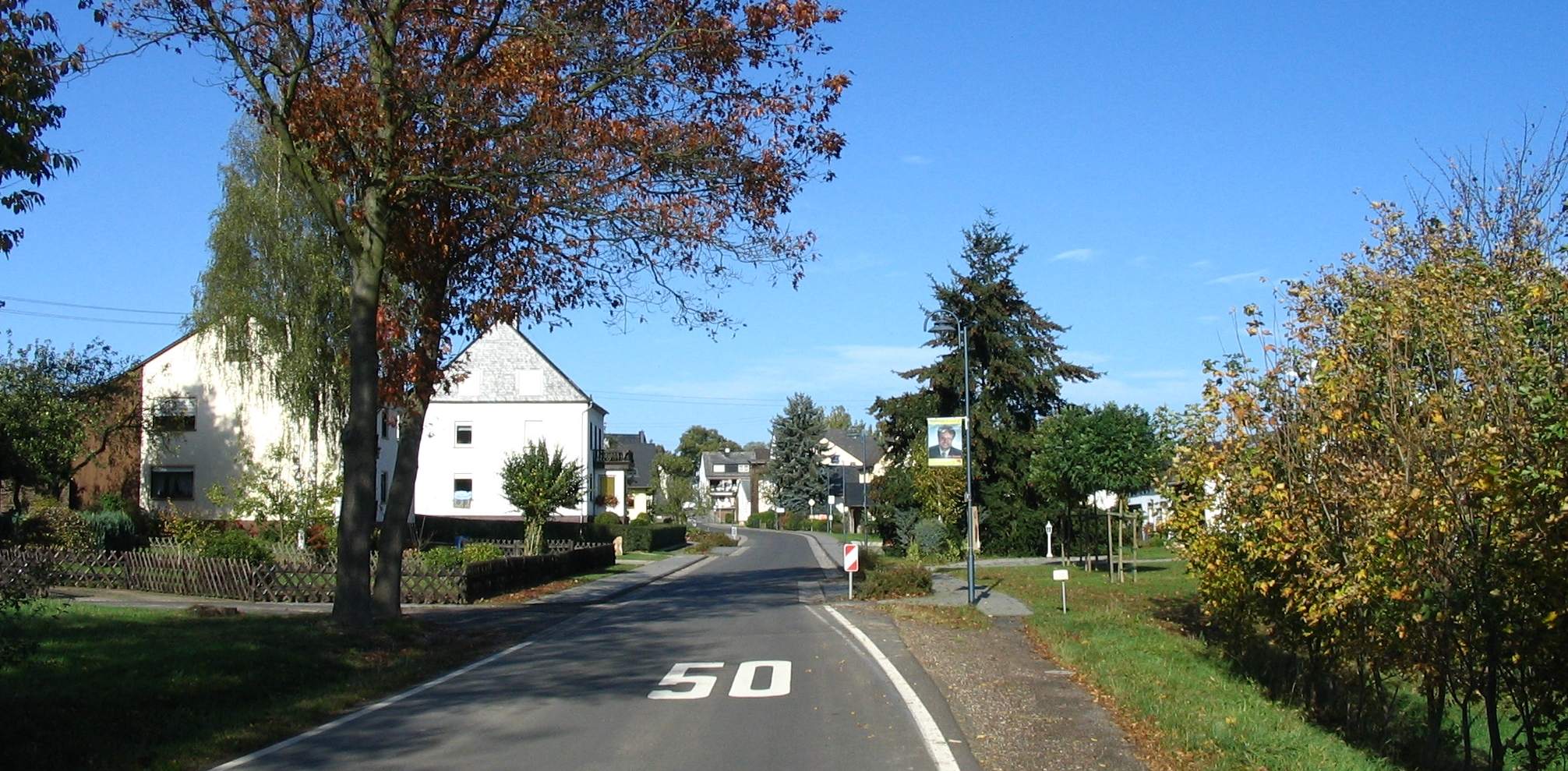
Village street

Nieder Kostenz is an Ortsgemeinde – a municipality belonging to a Verbandsgemeinde, a kind of collective municipality – in the Rhein-Hunsrück-Kreis (district) in Rhineland-Palatinate, Germany. It belongs to the Verbandsgemeinde of Kirchberg, whose seat is in the like-named town.

== Geography ==
=== Location ===
The municipality lies in the central Hunsrück in the Kyrbach valley, 2 km west of Kirchberg. The rural residential community has an area of 4.12 km^{2}, of which 1.19 km^{2} is wooded.

== History ==
=== Municipality’s name ===
The placename Nieder Kostenz first cropped up in 1310 in the Sponheimisches Gefälleregister, a taxation register kept by the County of Sponheim. Over the years, various spellings of the name appear on the historical record:

1310 – Costencia
1321 – Nydder-Costentzen
1361 – Nyder-Costentzen
1365 – Nyddern-Costentz
1399 – Nedercostencien
1411 – Nydercostencien
1414 – Nydern-Costenz
1762 – Nieder Costentz
1775 – Niedercostentz
1835 – Niedercostenz
1950 – Niederkostenz
1976 – Nieder Kostenz

=== Prehistory and protohistory ===
When Nieder Kostenz actually arose and when the first settlers came are things that nobody can answer with any certainty. A great many archaeological finds in the area, however, grave goods such as bronze rings and belt plaques, iron lance heads, iron combat knives and coins from Roman Emperor Vespasian’s time, bear witness to Celtic-Roman settlement in the area. There have been other Roman finds, too: foundation walls from a Roman settlement, a water duct, tiles and potsherds.

Julius Caesar’s writings identify the Hunsrück and neighbouring regions as the realm of the Treveri, a people of mixed Celtic and Germanic stock, from whom the Latin name for the city of Trier, Augusta Treverorum, is also derived. Nieder Kostenz’s current site was in Caesar’s time part of the Imperial province of Germania Superior.

By AD 496, the Franks were locally the undisputed rulers. Nieder Kostenz belonged to the Nahegau.

=== The Counts of Sponheim ===
Bit by bit, the Gaugrafen, the counts who headed the Gaue, ceased to be mere royal officials and became more autonomous. In the 11th century, the Counts of Sponheim came to lead the Nahegau. Mechthild, the last daughter of the Counts of Dill (or Dyll), wed Count Maginhard of Sponheim in 1124, thus putting Nieder Kostenz, which had hitherto belonged to Dill, under the Counts of Sponheim. In 1233, the parts of the County of Sponheim on the Rhine’s left bank were split between two lines of the comital house, with the two resulting parts known as the “Further” and “Hinder” Counties. Nieder Kostenz found itself in the former, ruled by the Kreuznach line, which died out in its male line in 1414. The heir was Countess Elisabeth of Sponheim. Her county, however, did not remain entirely with her or her heirs. She ceded one fifth to Electoral Palatinate in 1416, and after her death, the remaining four fifths passed to the Sponheim-Starkenburg line, with Electoral Palatinate receiving a further fifth of the “Further” County in 1422. Once the Starkenburg line had died out in 1437, three fifths of the “Further” County went to the County of Veldenz and Baden. When the Counts of Veldenz, too, died out, they were succeeded by Palatinate-Simmern. Under the 1509 treaty, the fifth ceded to Electoral Palatinate in 1422 was transferred to Simmern; from 1610 to 1659, the fifth ceded to Electoral Palatinate in 1416 also belonged to Simmern. From 1673 on, however, only Electoral Palatinate and Baden were still involved in the “Further” County of Sponheim. When Badish holdings were shared out in 1515, the share of the “Further” County of Sponheim went to the Margrave of Baden. These various parts of the County of Sponheim were long jointly ruled, with the “Further” County considered to be a condominium jointly held by Electoral Palatinate and Baden, with the former holding a three-fifths share and the latter holding a two-fifths share. On 24 August 1707, the “Further” County was sundered in a treaty between Electoral Palatinate and Baden-Baden, and in 1771, the Margraves’ share passed to Baden.

Counts of Sponheim had their seat in Bad Kreuznach. Nieder Kostenz was in the Amt of Kirchberg and more locally in the Pflege (literally “care”, but actually a local geopolitical unit headed by a Pflegeschultheiß) of Kostenz. This was further divided during Badish rule into three smaller Pflegen, Belg, Denzen and Nieder Kostenz. Through all these divisions, administration was never divided, only the earnings from these lands. The rulers were joint lords (Gemeinherren). In 1707, however, this arrangement came to an end after three centuries; the “Further” County passed to Baden, remaining with it, even after a further division in 1776, until 1794.

=== The Reformation and the Thirty Years' War ===
Under a decree issued by Frederick, Duke of Palatinate-Simmern (who would soon also become Frederick III, Elector Palatine) on 16 July 1557, the Reformation was introduced into the Principality of Simmern. This automatically changed the subjects’ faith to make it the same as their ruler's.

In the Thirty Years' War, first the Spaniards, and then later the Swedes plundered and starved the region around Nieder Kostenz. Oral lore has it that there was a great famine in the area between 1635 and 1642. Moreover, many people fell victim to the Plague. King Louis XIV's French troops occupied the Palatinate and the Hunsrück in 1673, resulting in further plundering and laying waste. After Charles II, Elector Palatine died childless, war broke out yet again – the Nine Years' War (known in Germany as the Pfälzischer Erbfolgekrieg, or War of the Palatine Succession). This time, Louis XIV felt he had a right to make certain claims to the Palatinate because the late Charles's only sister, Elizabeth Charlotte of the Palatinate (“Liselotte”), was married to the French king's brother, the Duke of Orléans.

In 1688, de facto religious freedom was introduced, and the available churches were allotted to either Catholic or Evangelical congregations, or in some cases, the two denominations would have to share a simultaneous church.

=== Badish times ===
Margrave Charles Frederick set himself to improving economic circumstances. Since the Hunsrück was then purely farmland, he strove to further agriculture. The farmers were made to undertake seed exchanging. Potato raising was forced. Cropraising was expanded and the yields were improved by introducing the three-field system. Presently, there was an attempt to move away from the simple pastoral economy to indoor breeding. The mean cattle and horse breeds were improved. It was forbidden to thatch roofs. It was also in Badish times that there were considerable improvements to infrastructure. Many roads were sealed, public building projects were undertaken and churches were built.

=== French rule ===
Under the treaty of 22 August 1796, Baden ceded all its holdings on the Rhine’s left bank to France. Nieder Kostenz belonged to the Department of Rhin-et-Moselle. Nieder Kostenz became a Mairie (“Mayoralty”) to which the following places also belonged: Kappel, Kludenbach, Metzenhausen, Ober Kostenz, Reckershausen, Schwarzen, Todenroth and Würrich. French became the official language, the Code civil des Français became the law of the land and a civil registry was introduced, in addition to the similar function that was still being performed by the Church. Also, the French Republican Calendar was introduced, although the Gregorian calendar was reintroduced in 1806

=== Prussian rule ===
The new Prussian administration that began in 1816 was not the only change brought about by the downfall of Napoleon's empire and its dismemberment by the Congress of Vienna. There were changes for agriculture, too. One goal was to dismantle the extensive pastoral economy. Heath and coppice lands were to be forested. The municipality, though, did not want to forsake the rights that it had won in the 17th century, as witnessed by two suits recorded in court documents in the Koblenz State Archives. In Dillendorf’s and Nieder Kostenz's submission in the case against the Prussian government, Dillendorf wanted to prove to the government that it had held grazing rights in the Dillwald (forest, now called the Brauschied) since the 17th century, and that it had the right to burn forest and use woodlands for haymaking. In the other court case from 1816, the villages of Kappel, Kludenbach, Todenroth, Metzenhausen, Nieder Kostenz, Ober Kostenz and Schwarzen fought against having to give up grazing rights, including the right to graze swine on acorns in the Hinterwald (forest). Nieder Kostenz had to forgo grazing rights at that time, although some other villages were allowed to keep them for a while.

Prussia forested the Dillwald, thus greatly limiting grazing. Moreover, Napoleon had sold a great deal of land off formerly held by local lords while he was in power, leaving rather little for the local farmers. This forced them to turn more towards intensive farming. This, however, meant that greater capital had to be sunk into the endeavour, something that many poorer families, and those with many children, simply could not manage. Furthermore, because land was being shared out among heirs in bequests, plots were becoming ever smaller, until it reached the point at which the land could no longer be subdivided.

Meanwhile, agents were trying to get people to settle in South America, especially in Brazil, which was willing to make available to any settler 70 to 80 ha of land, which was quite an inducement. Many young couples who had nothing to their name but their willingness to work felt forced to leave the Hunsrück forever and emigrate, either to South America or to the industrial centres, to seek the livelihood that eluded them at home.

=== German Empire ===
In the 1866 Austro-Prussian War, six men from Nieder Kostenz took part; eight took part in the Franco-Prussian War (1870–1871). None of these was either wounded or killed. The time following this war is known as the Gründerzeit – the Founders’ Time. It was in 1871 that the German Empire was founded. It was also in 1871 that the Kirchberg Savings and Loan Association was founded by, among others, Philipp Quaer II, who was from Nieder Kostenz, and who was later also the Association's chairman. The old pastoral economy, in which livestock was tended by herdsmen in the forest and on the heath, came to an end sometime around the turn of the 20th century. By that time, there was not only a paid herdsman, but also a herdsman's barn. This was later converted into a bull stable in 1901 and 1902; until 1894, it had had a thatch. In 1875, a cloudburst in the Kyrbach valley led to a great flood. The bridge in the village was heavily damaged while the one on the provincial road was partly swept away. As in many villages in the Hunsrück, an “Emperor’s Oak” was planted in Nieder Kostenz on Kaiser Wilhelm I's one hundredth birthday, 22 March 1897 (he had been dead for nine years by this time). It still stands today.

=== 20th century ===
In 1905, the municipality built a livestock scale. In late 1986 it was sold, as slaughter cattle were being sold at the price of dead meat and the scale had become unprofitable. On 20 June 1906, at the smith Friedrich Klein's house, a public telephone facility was installed. The municipality subsidized it.

==== The First World War ====
Thirty-seven men from Nieder Kostenz had to go to war. Two of them fell, and one went missing. The absence of so many men during the First World War made itself keenly felt in the constant labour shortage. Women, children and the elderly were pressed into service to help in the farm fields. The state required all agricultural produce to be handed over, but for the minimum needed for a farming family's personal consumption. This process was overseen by the police, who sometimes also searched houses or barns seeking hoards of food. A typical village meal at this time consisted of potatoes, bread, milk and vegetables. In 1916, though, the potato harvest was bad because of late blight (the same disease that caused the Great Famine of Ireland). At the time, no way was known to fight the blight. Luckily there was enough food to avoid a famine.

When the western front collapsed and the war had been lost in 1918, Nieder Kostenz had to host German troops many times during their retreat. Beginning in December, American, and then later French, troops came. The Americans were well supplied with food. The French, on the other hand, seized food. Aside from a couple of stolen chickens, however, there were no incidents.

After the French withdrew, the war was over for Nieder Kostenz. The warriors’ memorial was built in 1933 in honour of those who had fallen in the Great War.

==== Weimar times ====
Despite the rampant inflation in Germany in 1923, the year brought one good thing to Nieder Kostenz: electricity. More important than electric light, though, was the advent of electric motors, which began to be used for all kinds of machinery formerly powered by horses, oxen and cows, such as threshers. The inflation, however, did mean that it was quite a while before everyone who needed these motors had them. In the 1920s, there was almost no industry in the area besides agriculture. People in Nieder Kostenz fed themselves mainly from their own harvests. Besides a few handicraftsmen, such as cobblers, bricklayers, smiths and millers, almost everyone worked the land. In the winter, four to eight weeks’ work as a lumberjack could be had for extra earnings. The first industry was the sawmills. These were steam-driven and fired with waste wood and sawdust.

The winter of 1928-1929 was quite harsh; even the Rhine froze over, and there was a great deal of snow. This was also the time of the onset of the Great Depression, and this began to make itself felt in Nieder Kostenz, too. There was unemployment, with the numbers of jobless rising each year. In Nieder Kostenz, stone quarrying was introduced as “emergency work”.

After 1933, when Adolf Hitler came to power, wireless communication was expanded. Even the first cars and motorcycles began to disturb the rural idyll. Between 1934 and 1939, three quarries were opened. Since several local riverbeds and some farm lanes were being cobbled, there was a great demand for quarrystone, and the quarries yielded high-quality stone. In 1939, Nieder Kostenz created, together with Dillendorf and Hecken a coöperative potato steaming facility.

==== The Second World War ====
Forty-two men from Nieder Kostenz served in the Second World War, eleven of whom fell. Rationing began as early as 2 September 1939 – the day after Nazi Germany invaded Poland. In late November 1939, troops were quartered in Nieder Kostenz; a logistics unit from Hamburg wintered in the village. Army units were being brought from Poland to be redeployed along the western border. In the first winter of the war, a farming family from the Saarland was lodged in Nieder Kostenz after having to be evacuated from just behind the Siegfried Line. After the Battle of France had been won, 13 French prisoners of war came to Nieder Kostenz. They were put to work on the farms. In 1942, five Soviet and two Polish girls were brought to the village to work. In 1939 and 1940, a watch was established at the railway bridge.

Heavy bomber squadrons were seen flying by ever more often beginning in 1944. They twice dropped bombs on Nieder Kostenz. On 19 July 1944, six bombs fell in the rural area called Alwies, but nobody was harmed. On 8 September 1944, six heavy bombs were dropped, targeting the railway bridge, but they all missed. Beginning in the autumn, the railway and the bridge were attacked ever more often by fighter-bombers. On 6 October 1944, four fighter-bombers attacked the bridge, once more without success. Of the eight bombs that they dropped, two fell on the railway station, heavily damaging the waiting hut. When the bridge was attacked yet again in early 1945, one bomb struck the first arch in the bridge, causing heavy damage; this was later repaired.

In the war's dying days, an American fighter was shot down by German Flak; it crashed in the Brauschied (wood). When the Americans were advancing from the Moselle over the Hunsrück in March 1945, Nieder Kostenz was spared the throngs that beset some nearby places. The road now known as Bundesstraße 50 between Nieder Kostenz and Kirchberg lay for a while under American shellfire, but no shells struck Nieder Kostenz itself.

The Americans dissolved the German administration and administrative organs were provisionally named. Nieder Kostenz next found itself under French occupation.

==== After the war ====
Since 1946, Nieder Kostenz has been part of the then newly founded state of Rhineland-Palatinate. In the autumn of that year, the first municipal election since the Nazis’ Machtergreifung was held in Nieder Kostenz. Rationing was ended and a new currency, the Deutsche Mark, was introduced.

In 1948, Nieder Kostenz was still a village characterized by smallholder agriculture. Then came Flurbereinigung; the new consolidated fields could now be worked more intensively and more productively. The process was moreover accelerated by the mechanization that was coming to farming.

Also coming to Nieder Kostenz were people who had lost their homes to either aerial bombing of cities during the war or deportation in the wake of the Potsdam Agreement. To deal with this matter, the municipal council decided to build a “refugee house”. Building work began in the summer of 1952. A year later, the house, with its two dwellings, was ready for use. In 1953, a third dwelling was built into the attic.

In the early 1960s, a new bylaw abolishing compulsory labour was passed. After a 13-year pause, the kermis was held once again in 1961, staged by the men's singing club.

Between 1966 and 1975, administrative restructuring was undertaken in Rhineland-Palatinate. The Simmern district grew to encompass lands all the way to the Rhine, and on 7 June 1969, its name was changed to Rhein-Hunsrück-Kreis; Simmern, once the district's namesake, kept its position as the district seat. Also, the old Amt of Kirchberg became the Verbandsgemeinde of Kirchberg. Thus, for Nieder Kostenz, the centres of local administration did not change; they were still at Simmern and Kirchberg as they had been before.

Between 1989 and 1991, Bundesstraße 50 was realigned, bypassing Kirchberg, Sohren and Büchenbeuren. For Nieder Kostenz, this threw up an embankment that cut the Schlemmersmühle (mill) off from the rest of the village. The mill now finds itself between these earthworks and the old railway right-of-way.

In the early 1990s, it became possible once again, after many years, to build new housing in the village when a new building area was opened up. Until this happened, it had been customary for one child from the family to inherit the house and for the others to seek housing in neighbouring villages.

=== 21st century ===
In 2000 and 2001, a wind farm with seven wind turbines was built within Nieder Kostenz's limits. Between 2001 and 2004, the village thoroughfare – Landesstraße (State Road) 195 – which links Nieder Kostenz with Bundesstraße 50 and Ober Kostenz, was thoroughly modernized along with the municipality's other streets.

== Politics ==
=== Municipal council ===
The council is made up of 6 council members, who were elected by majority vote at the municipal election held on 7 June 2009, and the honorary mayor as chairman.

=== Mayor ===
Nieder Kostenz's mayor is Harald Gewehr.

=== Coat of arms ===
The German blazon reads: In gespaltenem Schild vorne das blau goldene Schach, hinten in Silber unter einem blauen schrägliegenden Wellenbalken ein schwarzes Wasserrad.

The municipality's arms might in English heraldic language be described thus: Per pale chequy of ten azure and Or and argent a bend sinister wavy enhanced, the end towards chief abased, of the first, below which a waterwheel spoked of eight sable.

The “chequy” pattern on the dexter (armsbearer's right, viewer's left) side recalls the “Further” County of Sponheim, whose counts were between 1248 and 1437 Nieder Kostenz's lords and landholders. Their arms bore the same pattern throughout the escutcheon in the same tinctures. The charges on the sinister (armsbearer's left, viewer's right) side represent the Kyrbach, the local brook, in the case of the bend sinister wavy, and the village's three old mills, in the case of the waterwheel; these mills are the once Sponheim-owned Eichenmühle, mentioned as early as 1438, the Bastenmühle (or Schlemmersmühle) and the Minnigsmühle (or Ulrichsmühle).

The arms have been borne since 10 June 1985.

== Culture and sightseeing ==
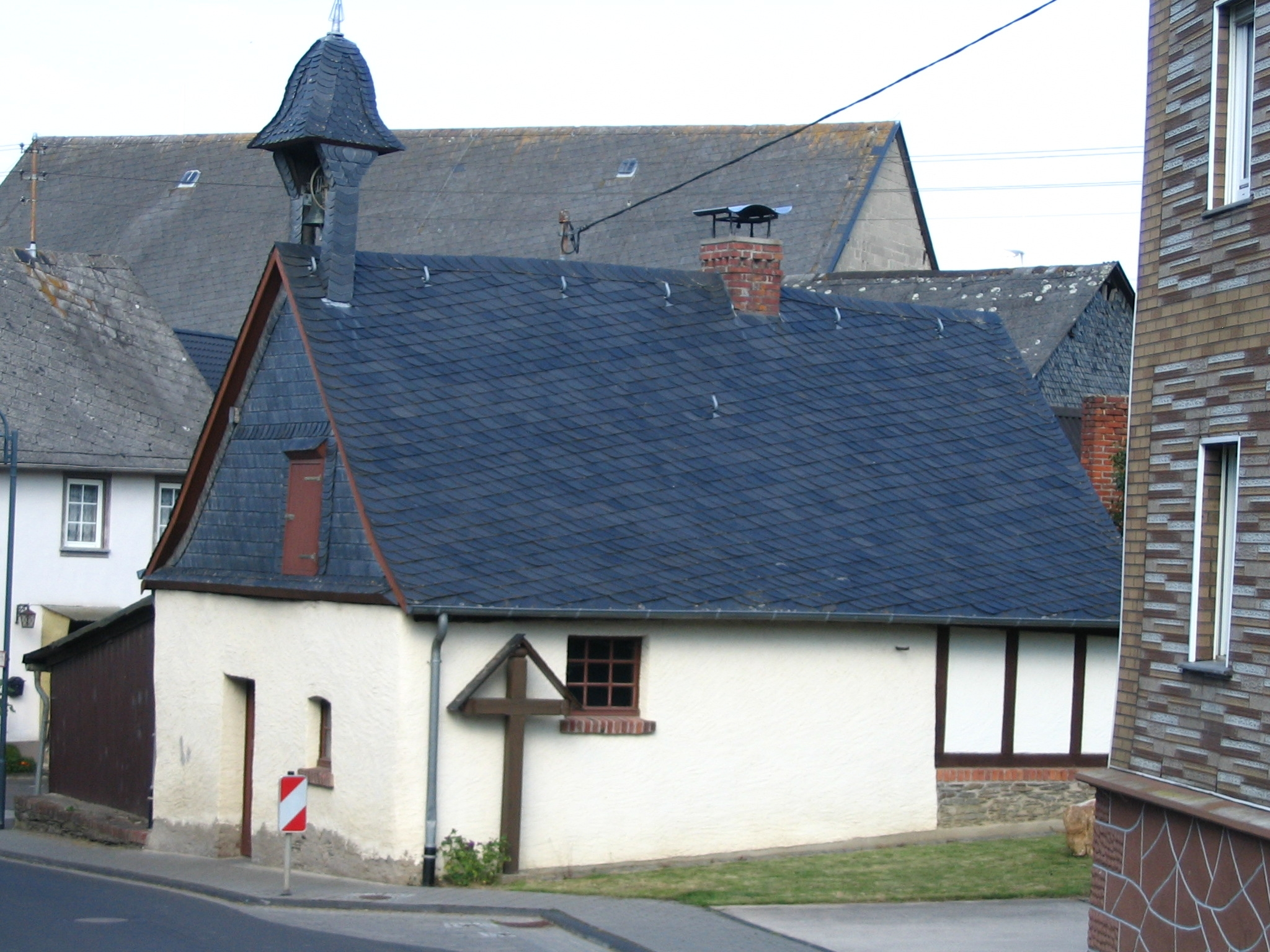
Hauptstraße 9: bakehouse

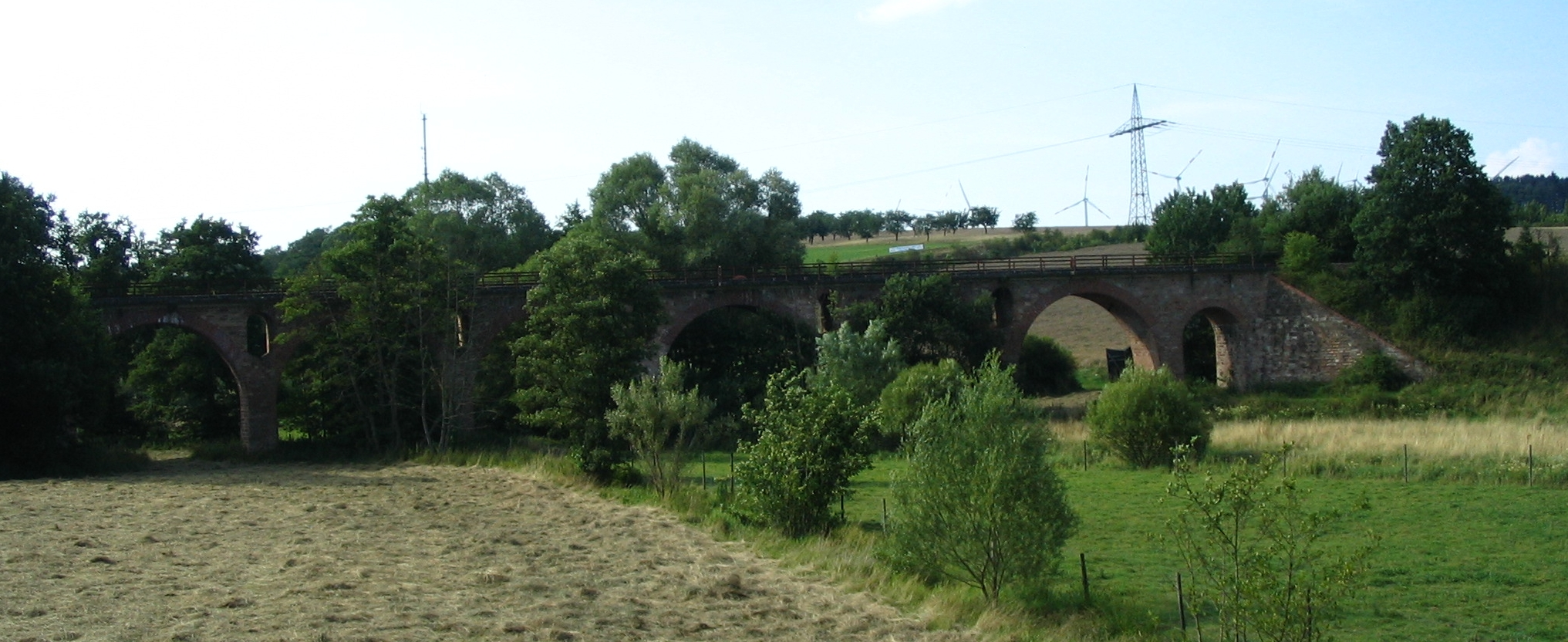
Railway bridge on the Hunsrückquerbahn

=== Buildings ===
The following are listed buildings or sites in Rhineland-Palatinate’s Directory of Cultural Monuments:

- Catholic Chapel of the Visitation (Kapelle Mariae Heimsuchung), Kapellenweg – Baroque aisleless church, 1752; whole complex of buildings with graveyard
- Hauptstraße 9 – bakehouse, 18th century
- Railway bridge, south of the village, south of Bundesstraße 50 – sandstone bridge on the Hunsrückquerbahn; about 1908

=== Regular events ===
- Yearly beach party held by the Näälische Niere Kostenzer

== Economy and infrastructure ==
=== Transport ===
Nieder Kostenz was a stop on the now disused Hunsrückquerbahn between Langenlonsheim and Hermeskeil.
