= Ober Kostenz =

- Municipality
- Coat of arms

- Location of Ober Kostenz within Rhein-Hunsrück-Kreis district
- Interactive map of Ober Kostenz
- Location within Germany Location within Rhineland-Palatinate
- Coordinates: 49°57′26″N 7°21′12″E
- Country: Germany
- State: Rhineland-Palatinate
- District: Rhein-Hunsrück-Kreis
- Municipal assoc.: Kirchberg

Government
  - Mayor (2019–24): Gerd Schreiner

Area
  - Total: 5.84 km^{2} (2.25 sq mi)
- Elevation: 370 m (1,210 ft)

Population (2025-12-31)
  - Total: 257
  - Density: 44.0/km^{2} (114/sq mi)
- Time zone: UTC+01:00 (CET)
  - Summer (DST): UTC+02:00 (CEST)
- Postal codes: 55481
- Dialling codes: 06763
- Vehicle registration: SIM

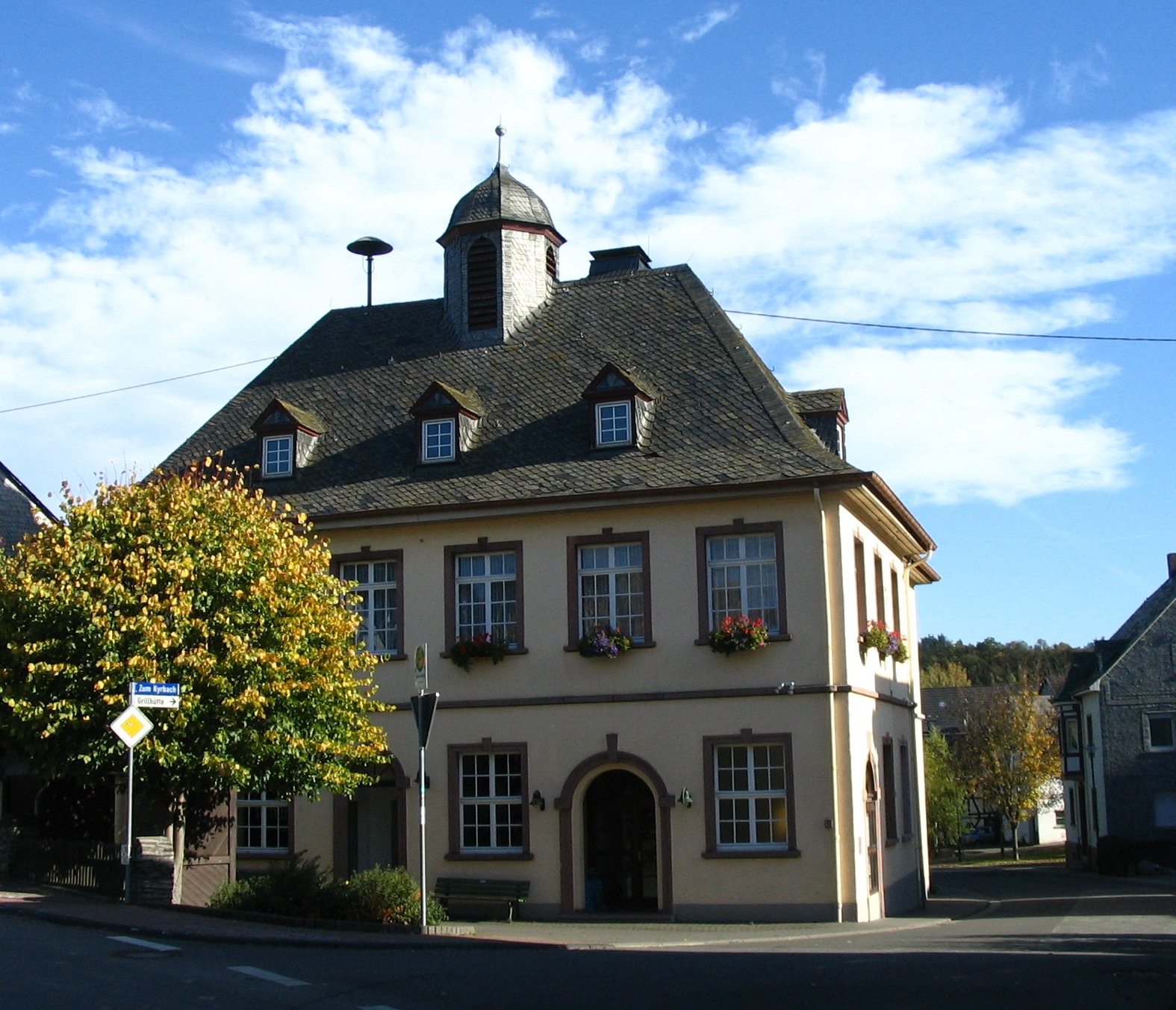
Municipal building in the village centre

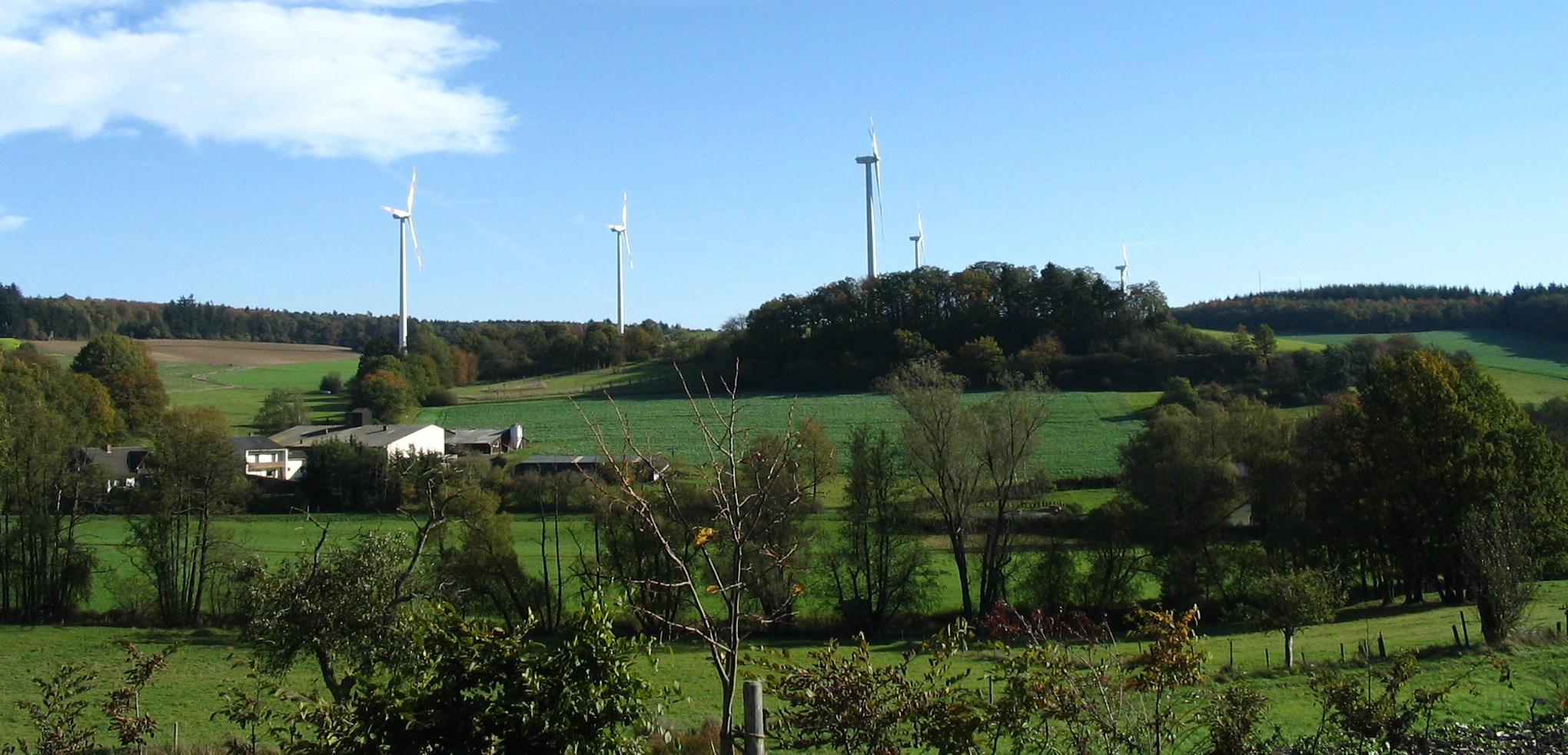
Wind farm towards Metzenhausen, Kirchberg

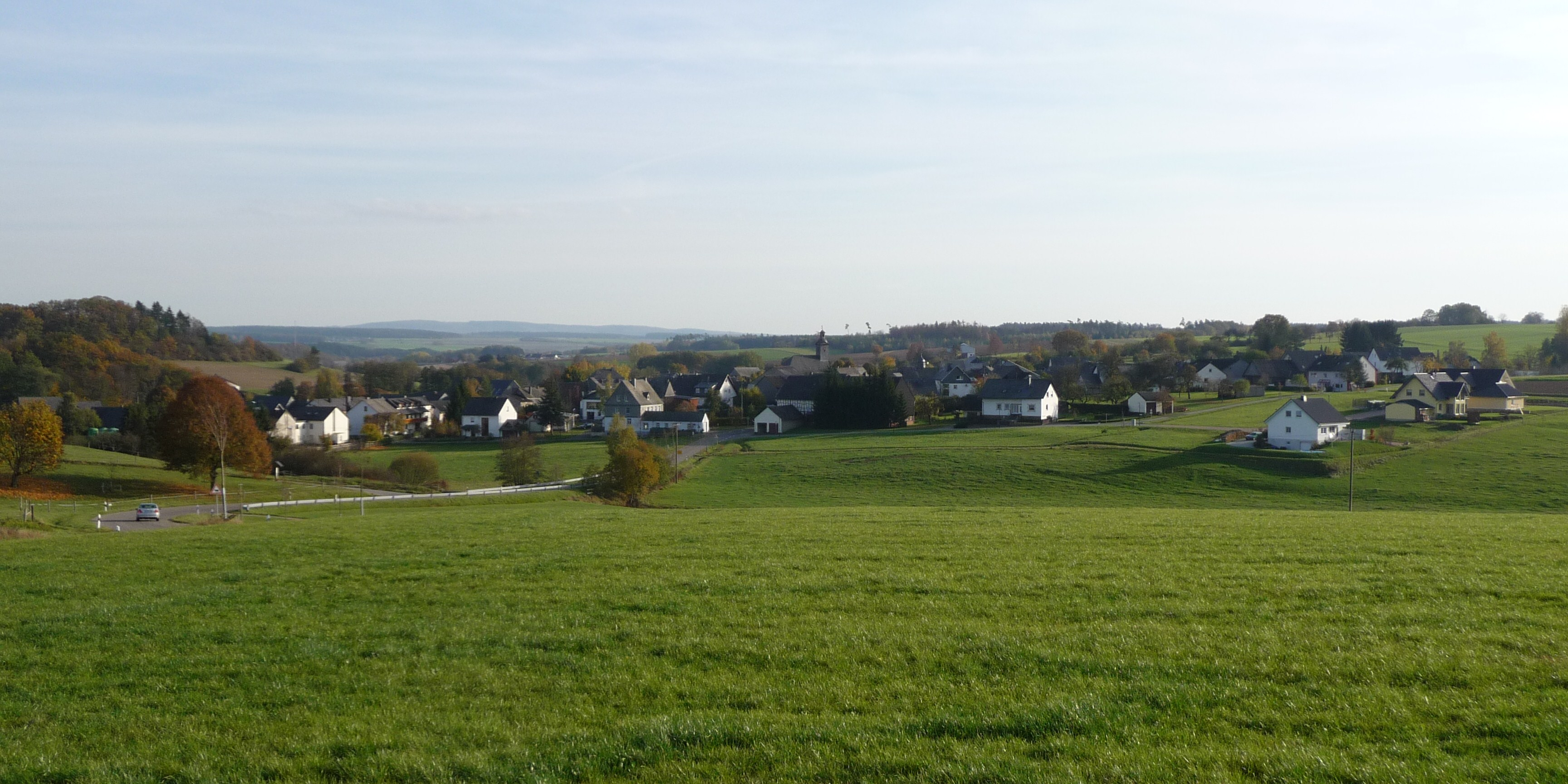
Ober Kostenz seen from the northwest

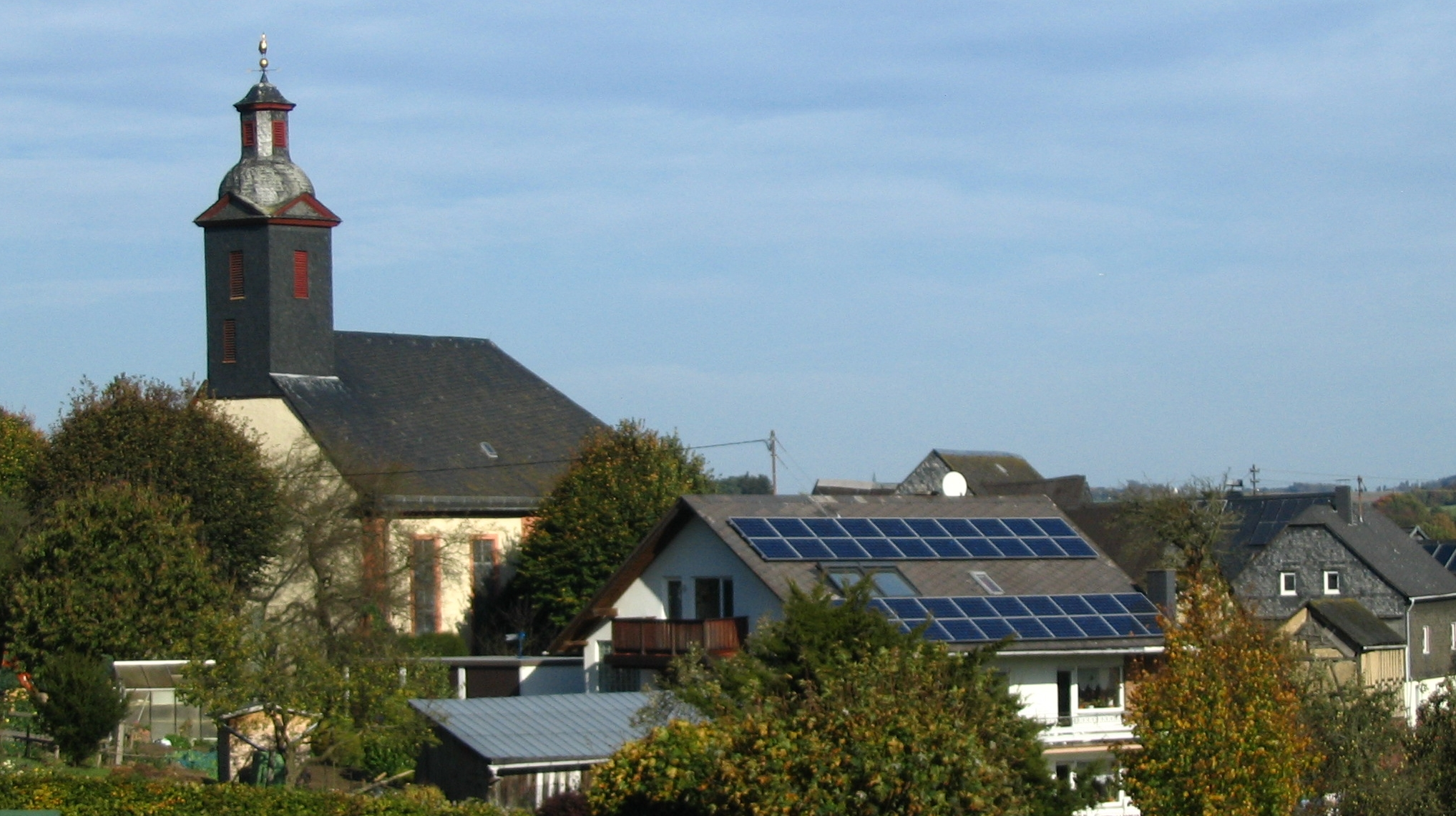
Osterbahn 3: Evangelical church

Ober Kostenz is an Ortsgemeinde – a municipality belonging to a Verbandsgemeinde, a kind of collective municipality – in the Rhein-Hunsrück-Kreis (district) in Rhineland-Palatinate, Germany. It belongs to the Verbandsgemeinde of Kirchberg, whose seat is in the like-named town.

== Geography ==
=== Location ===
The municipality, a rural residential community, lies in the Kyrbach valley in the central Hunsrück, roughly 4 km northwest of Kirchberg and 6 km northeast of Frankfurt-Hahn Airport. The municipal area measures 5.84 km², of which 2.06 km² is wooded.

== History ==
As in Nieder Kostenz, there was an early Roman settlement. A grave field from the 1st century on what is now Kreisstraße (District Road) 10 to the Hunsrückhöhenstraße (“Hunsrück Heights Road”, a scenic road across the Hunsrück built originally as a military road on Hermann Göring’s orders) was unearthed in 1939 and 1949. In 1220, Ober Kostenz had its first documentary mention in one of St. Maximin's Abbey's directories of holdings. Between 1286 and 1333, a local noble family who held a fief in Ober Kostenz from the Counts of Sponheim is witnessed. Later, the Elector of the Palatinate was the landholder. The village church was from 1689 to 1896 a simultaneous church. Today's Evangelical church comes from 1745, while the tower is likely mediaeval. Beginning in 1794, Ober Kostenz lay under French rule. In 1815 it was assigned to the Kingdom of Prussia at the Congress of Vienna. Since 1946, it has been part of the then newly founded state of Rhineland-Palatinate. In 1993, Ober Kostenz was honoured as the “Prettiest Municipality in the Regierungsbezirk of Koblenz.

== Religion ==
The Evangelical parish of Ober Kostenz, to which Schwarzen also belonged, merged in 1978 with the parish of Todenroth, while at the same time Kludenbach and Metzenhausen passed to Ober Kostenz. Parochially, Ober Kostenz, together with Würrich, has been tied to Sohren since November 2008.

== Politics ==
=== Municipal council ===
The council is made up of 6 council members, who were elected by majority vote at the municipal election held on 7 June 2009, and the honorary mayor as chairman.

=== Mayor ===
Ober Kostenz’s mayor is Gerd Schreiner, and his deputy is Klaus Rodenbusch.

=== Coat of arms ===
The German blazon reads: Unter zweireihig von Blau und Gold geschachtem Schildhaupt in goldenem Feld roter Schrägbalken, begleitet oben von einem schwarzen gotischen C, unten von einem schwarzen Halsreif.

The municipality’s arms might in English heraldic language be described thus: Below a chief countercompony azure and Or, Or a bend gules between a torc and a Gothic letter C, both sable.

The chief with the countercompony pattern (that is, two horizontal chequered rows) is a reference to the village’s former allegiance to the “Further” County of Sponheim and the Amt of Kirchberg. The red bend (slanted stripe) is a reference to the village's later allegiance to Baden. The letter C refers to the municipality's name (once written “Costenz”) and also to the knight Conrad von Costenz, who was mentioned in 1310. The black torc (of the Wendelring type) refers to the wealth of archaeological finds made in the grave field from the Hunsrück-Eifel Culture near the Eichelberg.

== Culture and sightseeing ==
=== Buildings ===
The following are listed buildings or sites in Rhineland-Palatinate’s Directory of Cultural Monuments:

- Evangelical church, Osterbahn 3 – mediaeval (?) tower, Classicist aisleless church, 1793; whole complex of buildings with graveyard
- Hauptstraße 7 – plastered timber-frame house, 18th or 19th century, timber-frame barn, half-hipped roof; whole complex of buildings
- Hauptstraße 21 – timber-frame house, partly solid, earlier half of the 19th century; whole complex of buildings with barns
- Raiffeisenstraße 15 – timber-frame house, partly slated, half-hipped roof, first third of the 19th century; whole complex of buildings

The Evangelical church also has a Stumm organ from 1891.

== Economy and infrastructure ==
Ober Kostenz is characterized by agriculture and handicrafts. East of Ober Kostenz lies the biggest wind farm in the Rhein-Hunsrück-Kreis with facilities by Vestas and Fuhrländer.
