= Todenroth =

- Municipality
- Coat of arms

- Location of Todenroth within Rhein-Hunsrück-Kreis district
- Interactive map of Todenroth
- Location within Germany Location within Rhineland-Palatinate
- Coordinates: 49°58′37″N 7°21′24″E
- Country: Germany
- State: Rhineland-Palatinate
- District: Rhein-Hunsrück-Kreis
- Municipal assoc.: Kirchberg

Government
  - Mayor (2019–24): Carsten Jürgen Neuls

Area
  - Total: 1.56 km^{2} (0.60 sq mi)
- Elevation: 390 m (1,280 ft)

Population (2025-12-31)
  - Total: 91
  - Density: 58/km^{2} (150/sq mi)
- Time zone: UTC+01:00 (CET)
  - Summer (DST): UTC+02:00 (CEST)
- Postal codes: 55481
- Dialling codes: 06763
- Vehicle registration: SIM

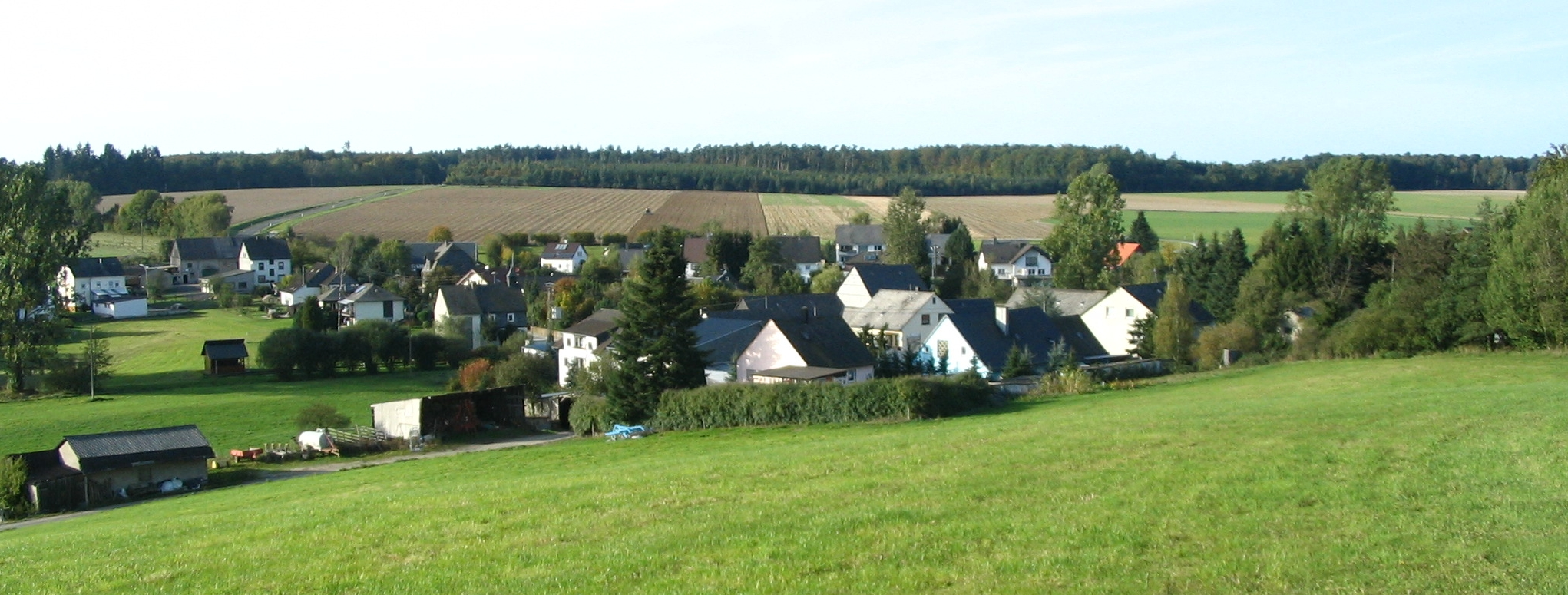
Todenroth seen from the south

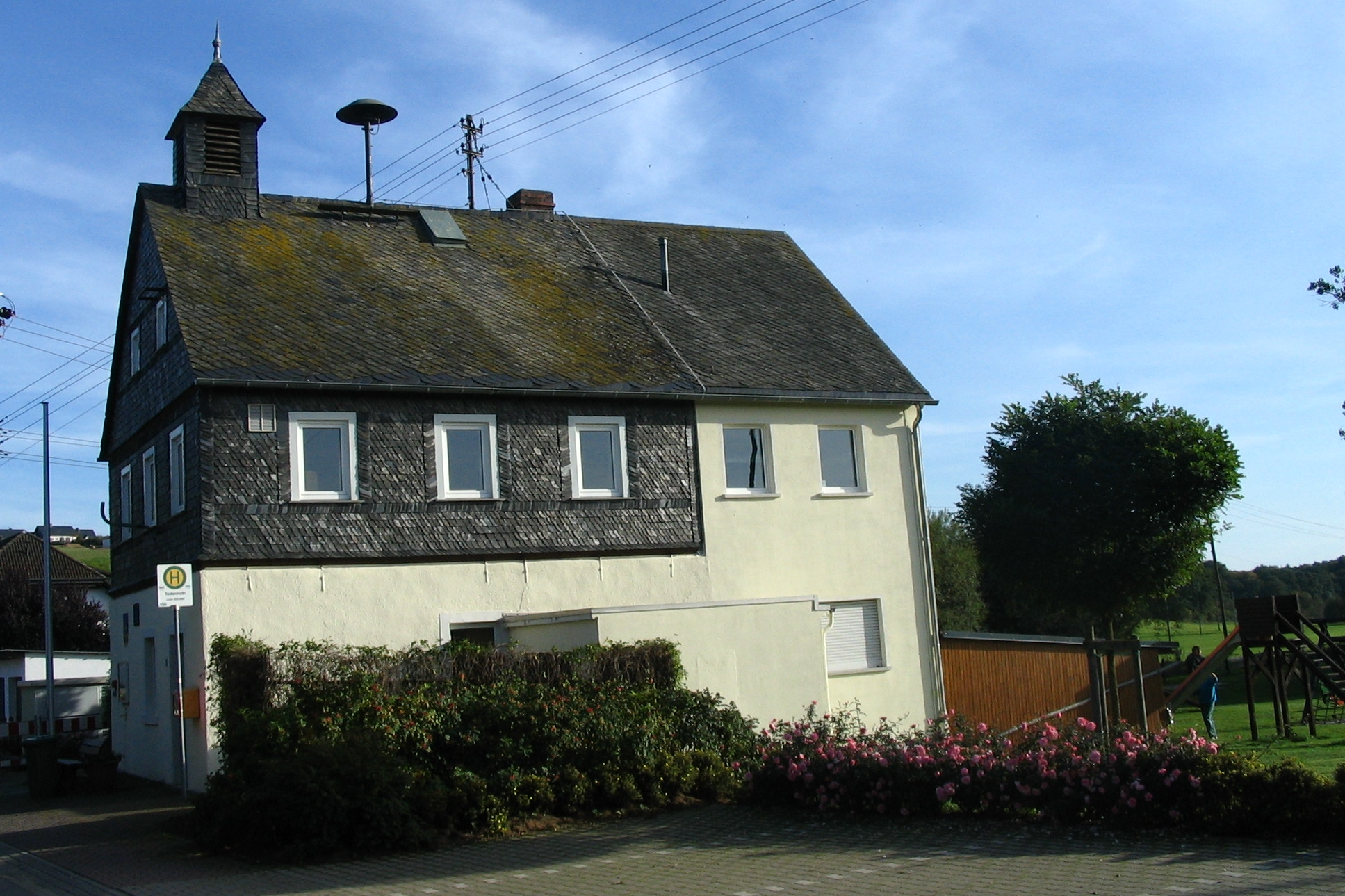
Municipal centre

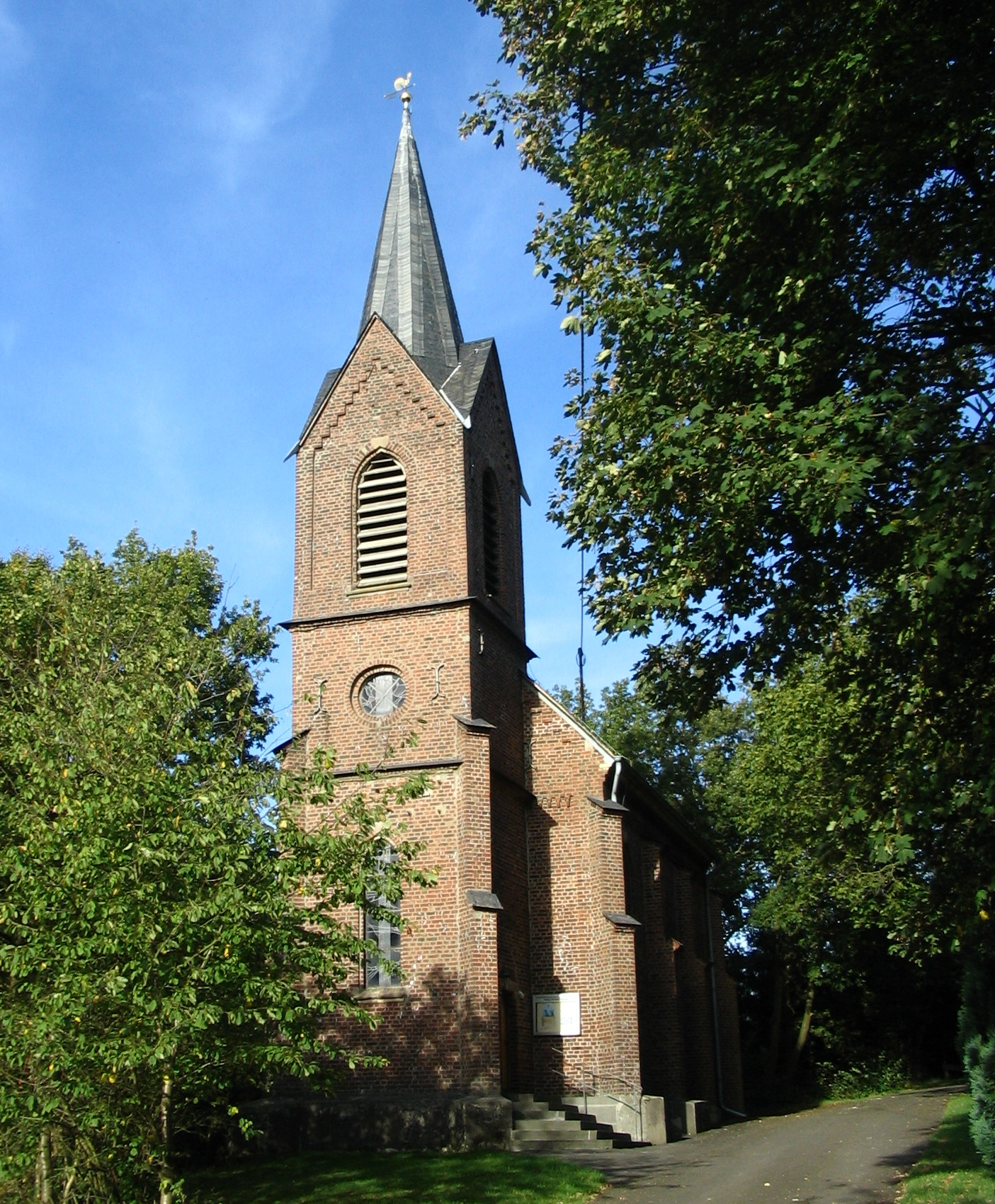
Evangelical church

Todenroth is an Ortsgemeinde – a municipality belonging to a Verbandsgemeinde, a kind of collective municipality – in the Rhein-Hunsrück-Kreis (district) in Rhineland-Palatinate, Germany. It belongs to the Verbandsgemeinde of Kirchberg, whose seat is in the like-named town.

== Geography ==
=== Location ===
The municipality lies in the central Hunsrück roughly 5 km northwest of Kirchberg. Todenroth's municipal area measures 1.56 km^{2}, of which 0.36 km^{2} is wooded.

== History ==
Roman archaeological finds have been unearthed east of the village on the way to Metzenhausen. Two coins (“grand bronze”) are from Antonius Pius’s reign (138-161). The reverse shows a standing woman with the mark SC. Another "grand bronze" coin from Hadrian's reign (117–138). The reverse shows a standing Diana with the SC. In District 1 of the municipal forest, a Roman bronze basin was found. It has a diameter of 24 cm and adornment.

In 1310, Todenroth had its first documentary mention in a taxation register kept by the Counts of Sponheim. In 1312, a document mentioned a man named Kunemann von Todenroth. The 1438 directory of holdings mentioned two Sponheim estates in Todenroth. Beginning in 1794, Todenroth lay under French rule. In 1815 it was assigned to the Kingdom of Prussia at the Congress of Vienna. The Evangelical church, a Gothic Revival aisleless church, was built in 1894. Since 1946, Todenroth has been part of the then newly founded state of Rhineland-Palatinate.

=== Religion ===
The Evangelical parish of Todenroth, to which Kludenbach and Metzenhausen also belonged, merged in 1978 with the Evangelical parish of Ober Kostenz.

== Politics ==
=== Municipal council ===
The council is made up of 6 council members, who were elected by majority vote at the municipal election held on 7 June 2009, and the honorary mayor as chairman.

=== Mayor ===
Todenroth's mayor is Carsten Jürgen Neuls.

=== Coat of arms ===
The German blazon reads: In Blau eine eingeschweifte goldene Spitze, darin drei schwarze Mühlräder 1 : 2. Vorn eine goldene Kirche. Hinten drei goldene Ähren.

The municipality's arms might in English heraldic language be described thus: Tierced in mantle, dexter azure a church affronty Or, sinister azure three ears of rye of the second and in base Or three waterwheels spoked of eight sable, two and one.

From the early 14th century, Todenroth is witnessed as a holding of the Counts of Sponheim. The tinctures azure and Or (blue and gold), which were the ones borne in the Counts’ “chequy” coat of arms, are a reference to the village's former allegiance to the “Further” County of Sponheim. The church on the dexter (armsbearer's right, viewer's left) side refers to the one that towers over the village. The ears of rye (called simply Ähren in the German blazon, or “ears”, but in English heraldry, at least, would be held to be rye because the ears droop) on the sinister (armsbearer's left, viewer's right) side refer to the municipality's former agricultural character. The waterwheels refer to the three mills that were once in the village, in the Kyrbach valley.

== Culture and sightseeing ==
=== Buildings ===
The following are listed buildings or sites in Rhineland-Palatinate’s Directory of Cultural Monuments:

- Evangelical church, Zum Hasenberg – Gothic Revival brick aisleless church, 1894

== Economy and infrastructure ==
=== Transport ===
Running by some two kilometres north of Todenroth is Bundesstraße 327, while two kilometres to the east is Bundesstraße 421.

Todenroth lies within the area served by the Verkehrsverbund Rhein-Mosel (VRM, Rhine-Moselle Transport Association). The Rheinhunsrückbus route 633 offers links to the nearby town of Kirchberg on schooldays. The nearest railway stations are Bullay on the Koblenz–Trier railway (25 km away), Emmelshausen on the Hunsrückbahn (28 km away) and Kirn on the Nahe Valley Railway (30 km away).
