= Kludenbach =

- Municipality
- Coat of arms

- Location of Kludenbach within Rhein-Hunsrück-Kreis district
- Interactive map of Kludenbach
- Location within Germany Location within Rhineland-Palatinate
- Coordinates: 49°59′19″N 7°22′10″E
- Country: Germany
- State: Rhineland-Palatinate
- District: Rhein-Hunsrück-Kreis
- Municipal assoc.: Kirchberg

Government
  - Mayor (2019–24): Walter Kuhn

Area
  - Total: 2.88 km^{2} (1.11 sq mi)
- Elevation: 420 m (1,380 ft)

Population (2025-12-31)
  - Total: 118
  - Density: 41.0/km^{2} (106/sq mi)
- Time zone: UTC+01:00 (CET)
  - Summer (DST): UTC+02:00 (CEST)
- Postal codes: 55481
- Dialling codes: 06763
- Vehicle registration: SIM

Kludenbach is an Ortsgemeinde – a municipality belonging to a Verbandsgemeinde, a kind of collective municipality – in the Rhein-Hunsrück-Kreis (district) in Rhineland-Palatinate, Germany. It belongs to the Verbandsgemeinde of Kirchberg, whose seat is in the like-named town.

== Geography ==
=== Location ===
The municipality lies in the Hunsrück roughly 2 km southeast of Kappel and 4 km west-northwest of Kirchberg. The Rhine flows 25 km to the east-northeast at Oberwesel. The area within Kludenbach's municipal limits is 288 ha, of which 80 ha is wooded.

== History ==
Prehistoric and early historic barrows can be found just south of Kludenbach right at the municipal limit with Metzenhausen, bearing witness to early settlers here. In 1173, Kludenbach had its first documentary mention in a donation document from Springiersbach Monastery that named a Sir Richard von Clodenbach. The Counts of Sponheim had an estate at Kludenbach. They and the Knights of Wildberg also held tithing rights. Early on, a village named Lampenrode (now Lampertsmühle) vanished. Beginning in 1794, Kludenbach lay under French rule. In 1815 it was assigned to the Kingdom of Prussia at the Congress of Vienna. In the 19th century, iron ore was mined east of Bundesstraße 421. Since 1946, it has been part of the then newly founded state of Rhineland-Palatinate.

== Politics ==
=== Municipal council ===
The council is made up of 6 council members, who were elected by majority vote at the municipal election held on 7 June 2009, and the honorary mayor as chairman.

=== Mayor ===
Kludenbach's mayor is Walter Kuhn, and his deputy is Stephan Marx.

=== Coat of arms ===
The German blazon reads: Schräglinks geteilt, vorne in rot unter einem achtspeichigen goldenen Mühlrad ein silberner Wellenbalken, hinten blau-goldenes Schach, belegt mit einer Abtskrümme rot-silber wechselnd.

The municipality's arms might in English heraldic language be described thus: Per bend sinister gules a waterwheel spoked of eight Or above a fess wavy abased argent and chequy of thirty of the second and azure surmounted by an abbot's staff sinister issuant from base sinister counterchanged, of the first on the second and of the third on the fourth.

The "chequy" pattern on the sinister (armsbearer's left, viewer's right) side refers to the former mediaeval landholders, the Counts of Sponheim. Kludenbach was part of the Sponheim Amt of Kirchberg. The waterwheel on the dexter (armsbearer's right, viewer's left) side recalls the two old mills that were run in the municipal area. The "fess wavy abased" (horizontal wavy stripe shown somewhat lower than the middle of the field) below this is a canting charge for the placename ending -bach (German for "brook"). The staff refers to Ravengiersburg Monastery, which held seven fiefs in Kludenbach. Each year in December, a special court day was held for these holdings. The Weistum (cognate with English wisdom, this was a legal pronouncement issued by men learned in law in the Middle Ages and early modern times) about this event is preserved.

== Notable people ==
- Horst Gehann, (1928–2007, died in Kludenbach), conductor, composer, concert organist, harpsichordist and music publisher
