= Metzenhausen =

- Municipality
- Coat of arms

- Location of Metzenhausen within Rhein-Hunsrück-Kreis district
- Interactive map of Metzenhausen
- Location within Germany Location within Rhineland-Palatinate
- Coordinates: 49°58′17″N 7°21′44″E
- Country: Germany
- State: Rhineland-Palatinate
- District: Rhein-Hunsrück-Kreis
- Municipal assoc.: Kirchberg

Government
  - Mayor (2019–24): Werner Nick

Area
  - Total: 3.09 km^{2} (1.19 sq mi)
- Elevation: 425 m (1,394 ft)

Population (2025-12-31)
  - Total: 101
  - Density: 32.7/km^{2} (84.7/sq mi)
- Time zone: UTC+01:00 (CET)
  - Summer (DST): UTC+02:00 (CEST)
- Postal codes: 55481
- Dialling codes: 06763
- Vehicle registration: SIM

Metzenhausen is an Ortsgemeinde – a municipality belonging to a Verbandsgemeinde, a kind of collective municipality – in the Rhein-Hunsrück-Kreis (district) in Rhineland-Palatinate, Germany. It belongs to the Verbandsgemeinde of Kirchberg, whose seat is in the like-named town.

== Geography ==
=== Location ===
The municipality lies in the central Hunsrück roughly 4 km (2 mi) northwest of Kirchberg and 7 km (4 mi) northeast of Frankfurt-Hahn Airport. The municipal area measures 309 ha (760 acres), of which 121 ha (300 acres) is wooded.

== History ==
The village got its name from a noble family. It was in 1278 that Conrad von Mentzenhusin (Metzenhausen) was mentioned. The best known representative of this Metzenhausen noble family, that lived in the village for just under 500 years, was Johann III of Metzenhausen, who from 1531 to 1540 was Archbishop of Trier. In 1317, Metzenhausen was raised to quasi-parish by Count Emich von Sponheim, who was also the pastor at Kirchberg. He equipped the chapel with properties at Todenroth and Lampenrode (a now vanished village). Beginning in 1794, Metzenhausen lay under French rule. In 1815 it was assigned to the Kingdom of Prussia at the Congress of Vienna. Since 1946, it has been part of the then newly founded state of Rhineland-Palatinate.

== Politics ==
=== Municipal council ===
The council is made up of six council members, who were elected by majority vote at the municipal election held on 7 June 2009, and the honorary mayor as chairman.

=== Mayor ===
Metzenhausen’s mayor is Werner Nick, and his deputy is Kurt Kilb.

=== Coat of arms ===
The German blazon reads: Das Wappen zeigt in von Gold und Blau in sechs Reihen geschachtem Schild einen schwarzen Pfahl, belegt mit silbernem Doppelhaken.

The municipality’s arms might in English heraldic language be described thus: Chequy Or and azure, a pale sable charged with a cramp palewise argent.

The “chequy” pattern is drawn from the arms formerly borne by the Counts of Sponheim.

== Culture and sightseeing ==
=== Buildings ===
The following are listed buildings or sites in Rhineland-Palatinate’s Directory of Cultural Monuments:

- Catholic Church of the Assumption of Mary (Kirche Mariä Himmelfahrt), Hauptstraße – Late Gothic aisleless church, essentially from the 16th century, nave converted possibly in the 17th century, extensive repairs in 1829-1831, sacristy, 1854; whole complex of buildings with graveyard (see also below)
- Backesweg 2 – timber-frame house, partly solid or slated, 18th century, barn 20th century; whole complex of buildings
- Mühlenweg 2 – so-called Heerehaus; building with hipped mansard roof, early 18th century
- Brühltaler Mühle, in the Brühltal (valley) between Metzenhausen and Todenroth – small watermill with complete works, latter half of the 19th century

==== Chapel ====
Worth seeing is the Chapel of the Assumption of Mary from the 15th century, whose quire was built in the Gothic style. It also has stained glass windows depicting Archbishop of Trier Johann III of Metzenhausen.

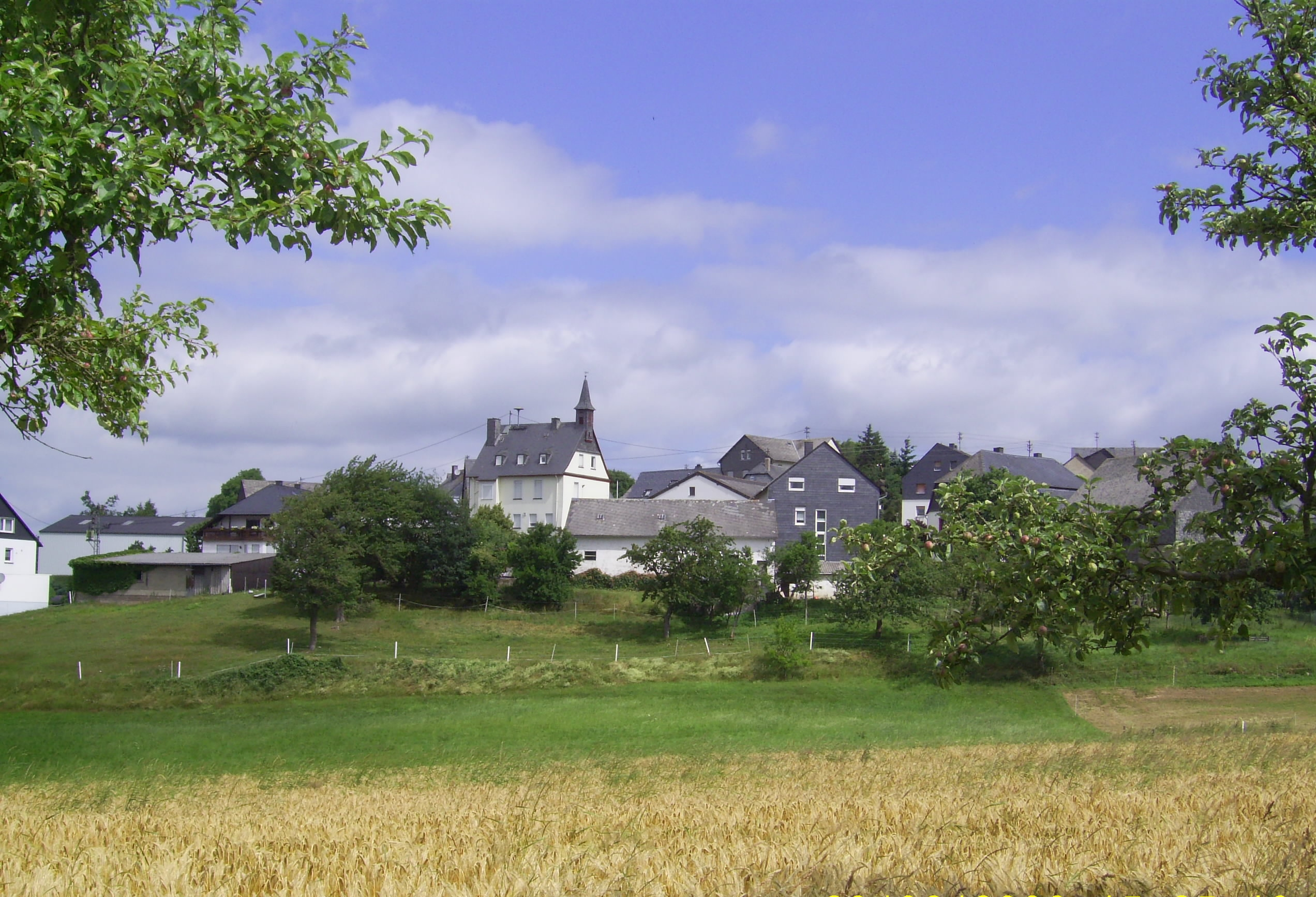
Metzenhausen seen from the southwest

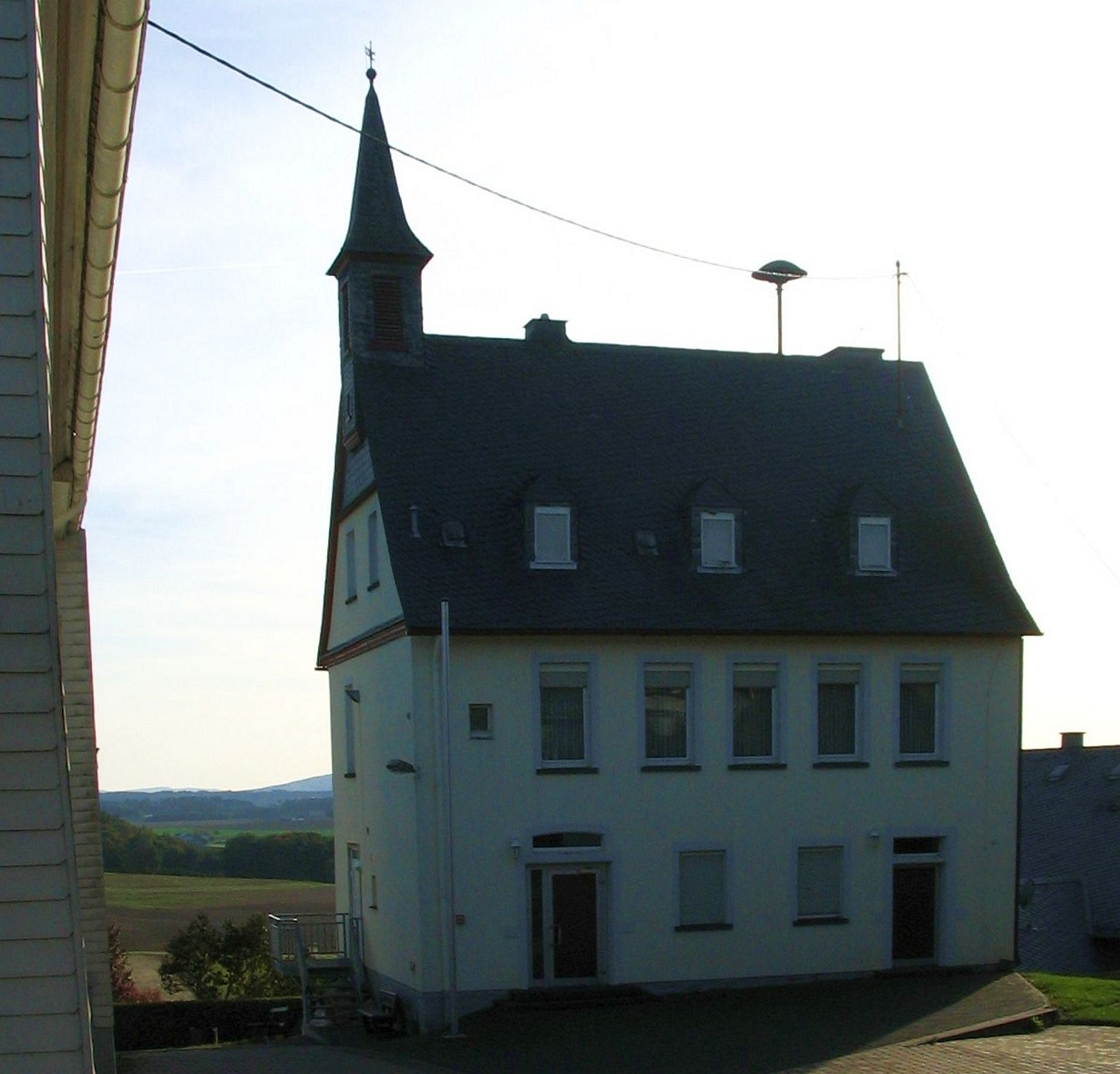
Municipal building in the village centre

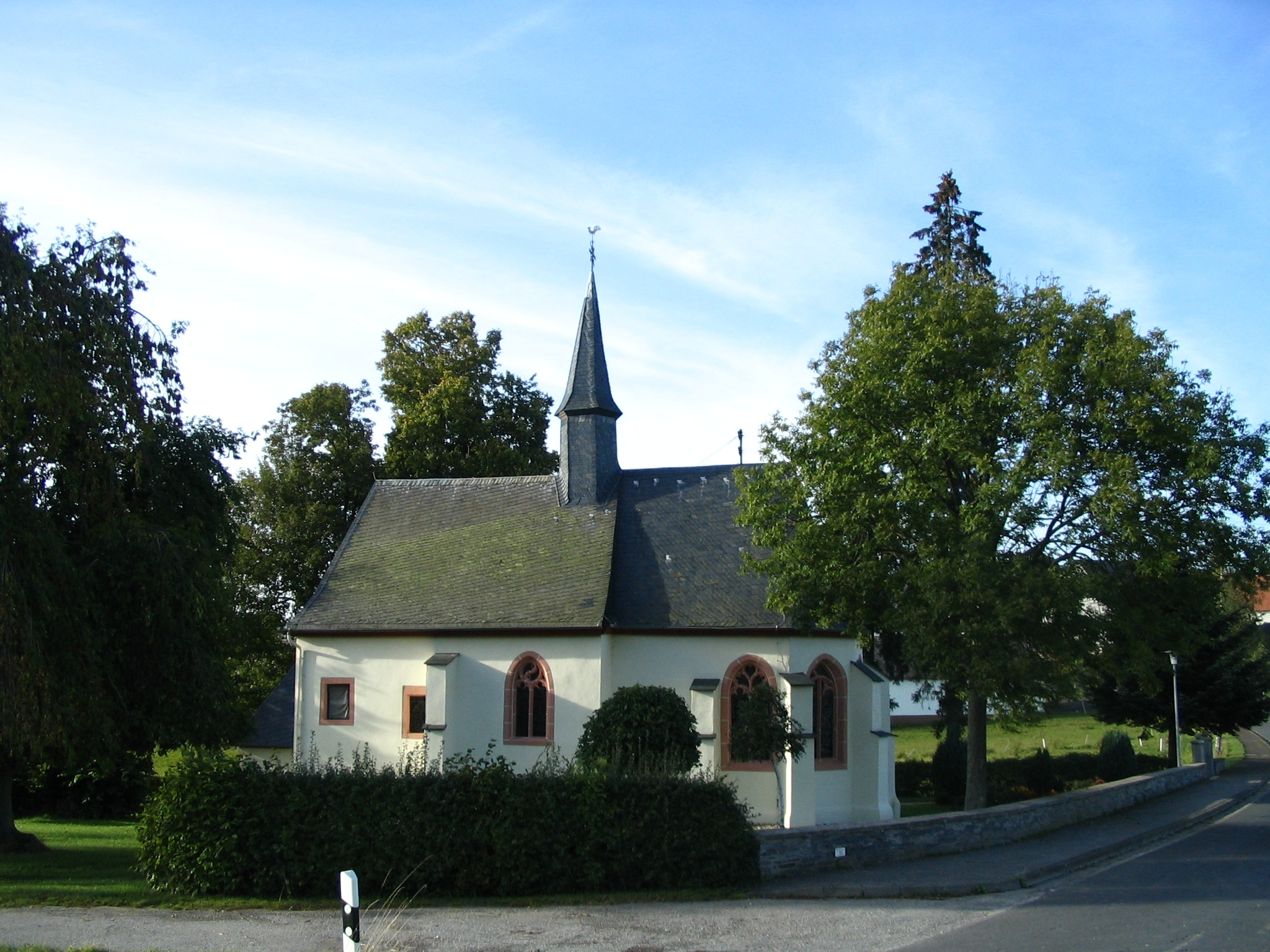
Chapel of the Assumption of Mary
