= Kirchberg, Rhein-Hunsrück =

Kirchberg
- Town
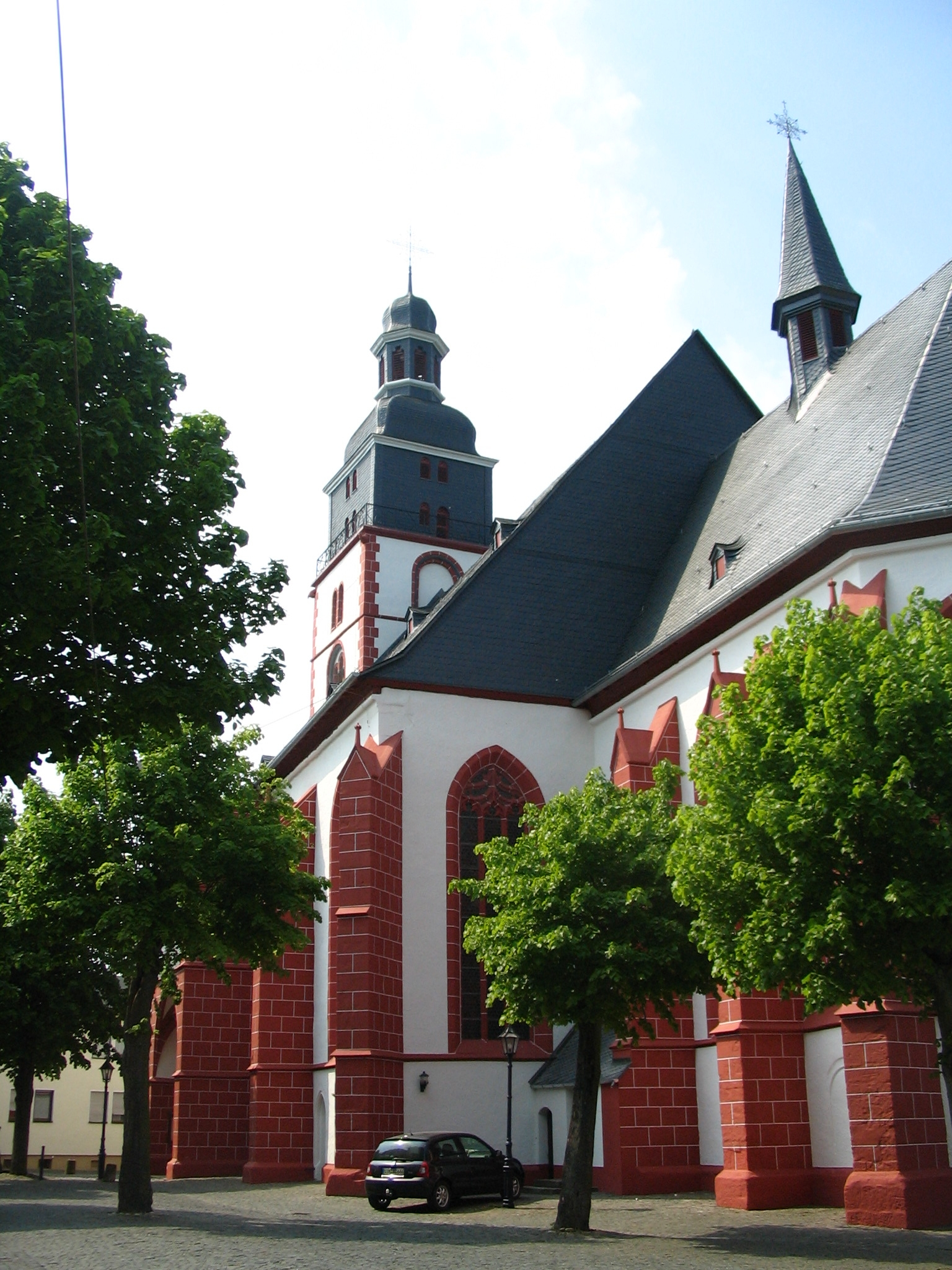
- St. Michaels Catholic Church in Kirchberg Hunsrück

- Coat of arms

- Location of Kirchberg within Rhein-Hunsrück-Kreis district
- Interactive map of Kirchberg
- Location within Germany Location within Rhineland-Palatinate
- Coordinates: 49°56′42″N 7°24′26″E
- Country: Germany
- State: Rhineland-Palatinate
- District: Rhein-Hunsrück-Kreis
- Municipal assoc.: Kirchberg

Government
  - Mayor (2019–24): Werner Wöllstein (FDP)

Area
  - Total: 18.05 km^{2} (6.97 sq mi)
- Elevation: 420 m (1,380 ft)

Population (2025-12-31)
  - Total: 4,158
  - Density: 230.4/km^{2} (596.6/sq mi)
- Time zone: UTC+01:00 (CET)
  - Summer (DST): UTC+02:00 (CEST)
- Postal codes: 55481
- Dialling codes: 06763
- Vehicle registration: SIM
- Website: www.stadtkirchberg-hunsrueck.de

Kirchberg (German pronunciation: [ˈkɪʁçbɛʁk]), the Stadt auf dem Berg (“Town on the Mountain”), called Kerbrich in Moselle Franconian, is a town in the Rhein-Hunsrück-Kreis (district) in Rhineland-Palatinate, Germany. It is the seat of the like-named Verbandsgemeinde, to which it also belongs.

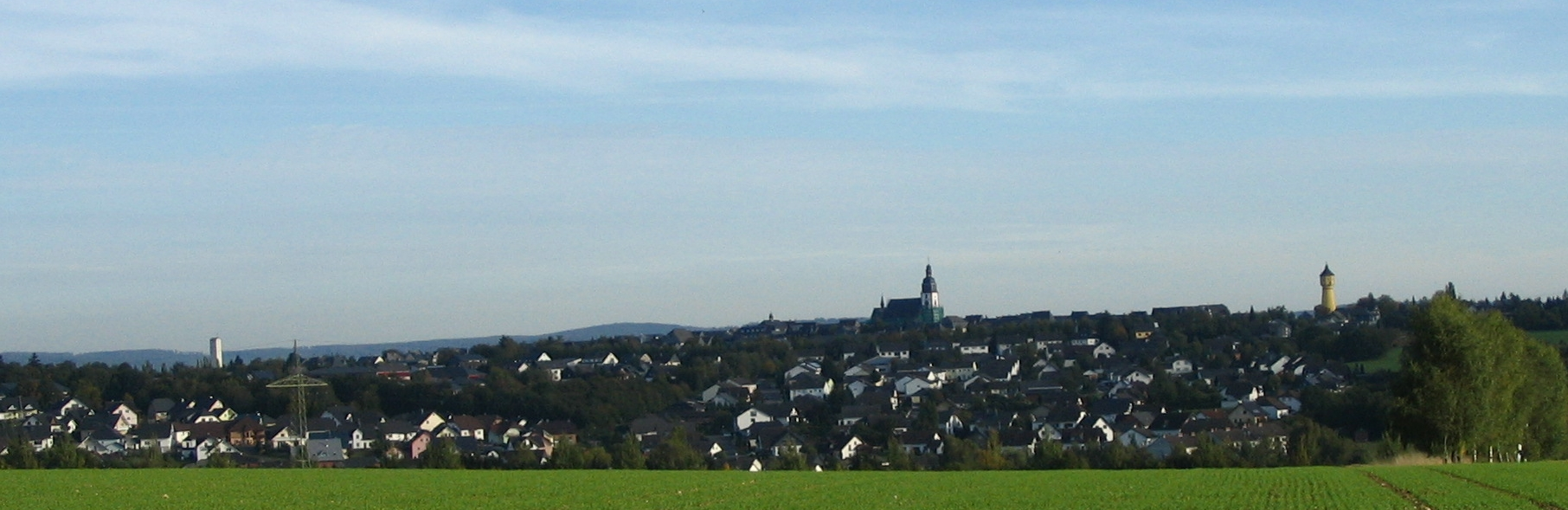
View from the north of Kirchberg with the three towers: watertower, Saint Michael’s Church and Friedenskirche (“Peace Church”)

== Geography ==
=== Location ===
The town lies in the Hunsrück, 10 km west of the district seat of Simmern and 12 km east of Frankfurt-Hahn Airport.

Kirchberg's skyline, with its three towers – two churchtowers and one watertower – can be seen from a long way off, for they stand on raised land that gives the town its nickname “Town on the Mountain”. From the churchtower at Saint Michael's, the following places can be seen: to the southeast, the Soonwald (a heavily wooded section of the west-central Hunsrück) with the Koppenstein castle ruin; to the south, the Lützelsoon (a little outlier of the Soonwald); to the southwest, the Idarkopf and the Erbeskopf (mountains, the latter of which, at 816 m above sea level is Rhineland-Palatinate's highest point); to the northeast, the area around Kastellaun; to the east, the district seat of Simmern. West of Kirchberg lies the Kyrbach valley, and to the east the Kauerbach valley. To the town's north runs the Hunsrückhöhenstraße (“Hunsrück Heights Road”, a scenic road across the Hunsrück built originally as a military road on Hermann Göring’s orders) from Saarburg to Koblenz (Bundesstraße 327).

Aerial photographs of Kirchberg clearly show how the town has developed in stages: The outlying centre of Denzen (from the Celtic Dumno), lying in a hollow to the northeast, had its beginnings in a pre-Roman settlement; the town’s east end was a military base on the Roman road from Trier over the Hunsrück to Bingen am Rhein and Mainz, nowadays known as the Via Ausonia (Ausoniusstraße in German). The mediaeval town centre was girded by a wall with towers and town gates whose course can still be seen from aloft. Around the oval of this former town wall arose residential neighbourhoods, schools and sport facilities, allotments and industrial parks in the time that followed. The Old Town is today still crossed by the course of the old Roman road, which, as was so typical of roads that the Romans built, is dead straight.

=== Land use ===
The area within the town’s limits measures 18 km², of which 50% is given over to agriculture, 30% is wooded, 18% is built up and 2% is devoted to other uses.

== History ==
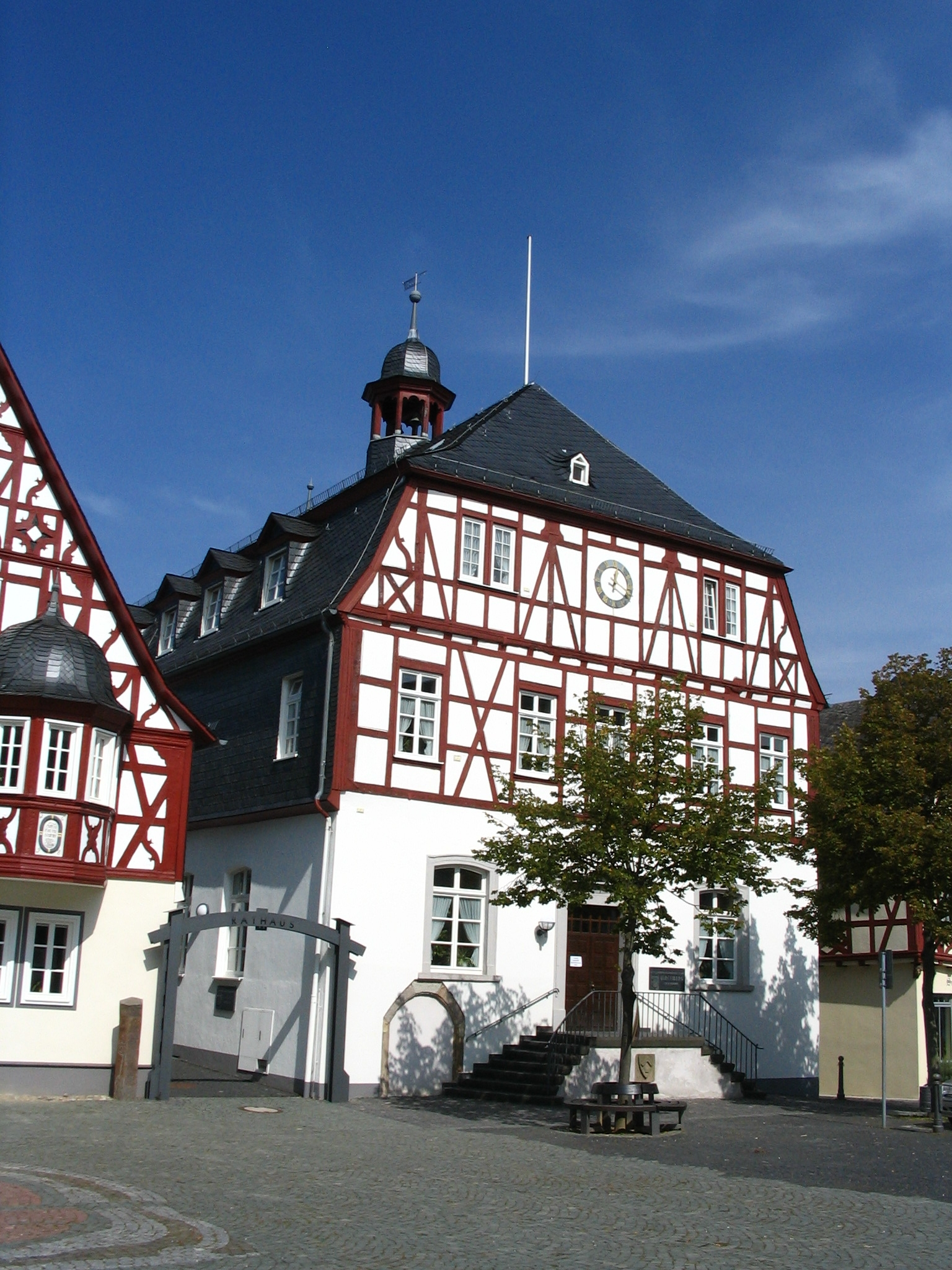
Kirchberg town hall and marketplace

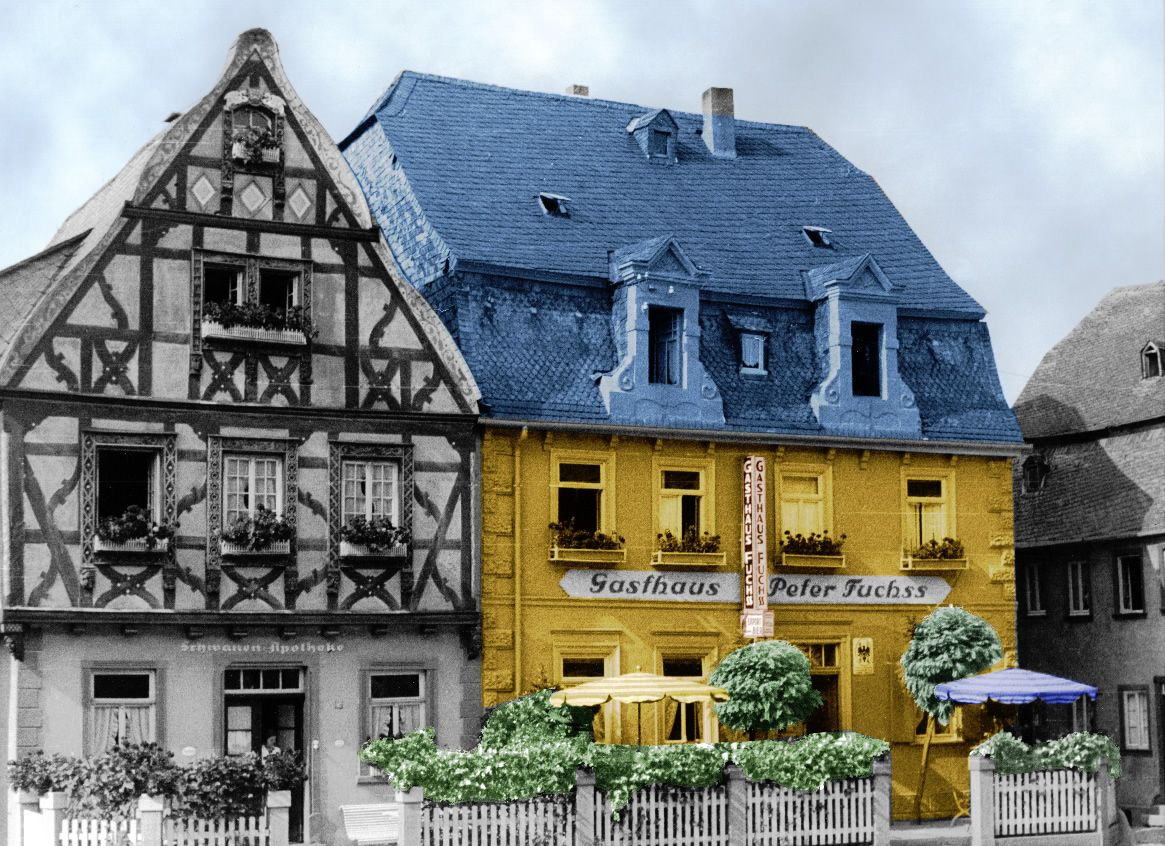
Schwanen-Apotheke (pharmacy) and Jägerhof (an inn) in Kirchberg

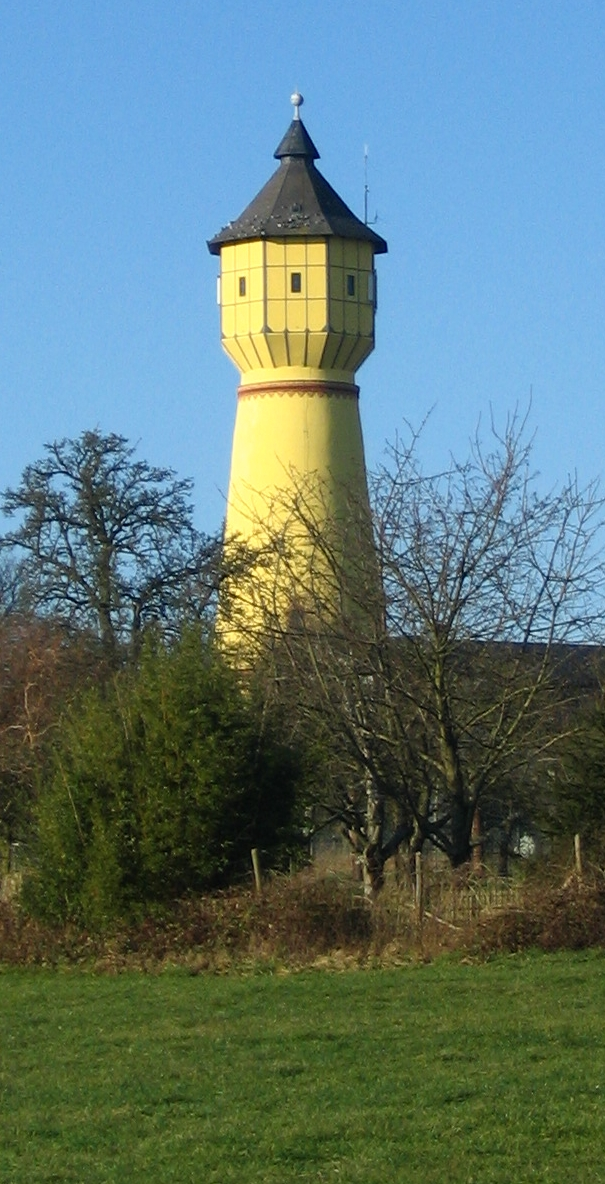
Renovated watertower

Archaeological finds make it clear that by 400 BC, the Treveri, a people of mixed Celtic and Germanic stock, from whom the Latin name for the city of Trier, Augusta Treverorum, is also derived, had settled here. In the 1st century BC, the Romans built a military road, the so-called Via Ausonia, from Trier by way of Neumagen, the Stumpfer Turm (“Stub Tower”) near Wederath (the Roman Belginum on the boundary between the Roman provinces of Belgica and Germania Inferior), Kirchberg and Bingen to Mainz. In what is now the town's east end, they built a settlement called Dumno or Vicus Dumnissus. This name is shown on a roadmap from late antiquity – the 4th century AD – of which today still exists an accurate copy from the 12th century, the Tabula Peutingeriana, named after its discoverer, Konrad Peutinger. In 368, the Roman poet and educator Decimius Magnus Ausonius also mentioned Dumnissus in his poem Mosella, which contains a poetic description of his trip from Bingen by way of the Hunsrück to Neumagen and Trier. This makes Kirchberg the oldest known settlement on the heights framed by the Moselle, the Rhine, the Nahe and the Saar.

In the 5th century, Rome's holdings passed to the Frankish kings’ crown estate. From the Roman settlement of Vicus Dumnissus arose a new settlement, which no later than the 7th century got its first church, a wooden building that was likely built on the same spot where Saint Michael's Church now stands. This new settlement was named Chiriperg, from which developed the modern name Kirchberg. In 995, King Otto III bestowed upon Count of the Trechirgau Bezelin, the forefather of the Gau-comital family Berthold-Bezelin, the hitherto royal estate of Denzen (praedium Domnissa). In 1074, the family then transferred the eastern half of this holding, along with the village of Denzen, to the Ravengiersburg Augustinian Canonical Foundation, which the counts had endowed. The western half, along with Kirchberg, passed in 1248 to the Counts of Sponheim. Thereafter, Kirchberg's historical development was tightly bound to the Sponheims and their heirs. Kirchberg was granted town rights in 1259, making it the oldest town on the Hunsrück.

When the County of Sponheim was partitioned in the 13th century into the “Further” and “Hinder” Counties, the Amt of Kirchberg passed to the former, and then once the Sponheims had died out in 1437 to the joint lordship of the Elector of the Palatinate, the Margrave of Baden and the Count of Veldenz (later Palatinate-Simmern) with the administrative seat in Kirchberg. In 1689, French troops destroyed the town and its defences. The joint lordship was brought to an end by the 1708 Realteilung (literally “material division”), whereby the Amt of Kirchberg passed, along with the Unteramt of Koppenstein, to Baden; Kirchberg became the seat of the like-named Badish Oberamt. The last Badish Oberamtmann was Baron Karl Wilhelm Ludwig Friedrich Drais von Sauerbronn, whose son was Karl Drais, the inventor of the velocipede and the draisine. From 1794 to 1814, Kirchberg was the administrative seat of a French canton in the arrondissement of Simmern; in 1815 the town became the seat of a Prussian Landbürgermeisterei (“Rural Mayoralty”) with 18 outlying municipalities.

On 10 February 1928, the neighbouring village to the east, Denzen, the former Dumnissus, was amalgamated with the town of Kirchberg despite the villagers’ resistance to the move. Since 1946, the town has been part of the then newly founded state of Rhineland-Palatinate.

== Religion ==
=== Ecclesiastical relations ===
As early as Carolingian times, the greater parish of Kirchberg had arisen on the lands of the Denzen crown estate with a central baptismal church in Kirchberg along with chapels in Gemünden, Dickenschied, Womrath, Denzen, Kappel, Metzenhausen, Ober Kostenz, Würrich and Altlay. Until the 16th century, Kirchberg was one of the important centres of clerical organization on the countryside. The pastoral region of Kirchberg comprised 51 towns and villages.

Elector Palatine Ottheinrich arranged visitation for the Amt of Kirchberg and introduced the Lutheran faith. In May 1599 came another official conversion: under Frederick IV, Elector Palatine, the Reformed faith became the prescribed belief.

This was not the last time that religious beliefs were imposed by lords or military authorities. As of 1625, under Spanish occupation, Catholicism was reintroduced; between 1631 and 1635, under Swedish influence, it was the Reformed faith once again; between 1635 and 1648 it was once again Catholicism; as of 1648, it was yet again the Reformed faith. By agreement in 1652, the Catholics were granted the right to celebrate Mass at the Badish seneschal’s house.

=== Michaelskirche ===
In 1688, a simultaneum was introduced at Saint Michael’s Church (Michaelskirche) on the condition that Catholics and Evangelicals were to hold their services alone at predetermined times at the church whose ownership they shared, each holding half. The Catholics were furthermore granted the sole right to use the quire with its High Altar, the two side altars and the confessionals. This simultaneum was dissolved by a notarial agreement with both denominations’ assent on 15 June 1965, and a new arrangement was put in place: the Evangelical parish sold the Catholic parish its one-half share in the church, which allowed the former to make possible a new church building, the Friedenskirche (“Peace Church”) with a community centre. A further ruling allowed the Evangelical parish to use Saint Michael's Church, as before, until its own church was ready for use, and further still, it allowed the Catholic parish to be guests at the Friedenskirche as long as thorough restoration work was being undertaken at Saint Michael's and its tower and until preliminary archaeological digs by the Koblenz Office for Prehistory and Protohistory (Amt für Vor- und Frühgeschichte, Koblenz) were over. All work was complete on 6 July 1969.

The digs under Saint Michael's Church brought to light that the buildings were the most historically important and quite possibly the oldest church buildings on the Hunsrück, and that the current Late Gothic hall church in Kirchberg's town centre had three stone predecessor buildings. Their foundations were partly unearthed and can now be visited under the church's quire.

Building I from the time after 700 was a small, rectangular aisleless church with a square quire that was narrower than the nave. Among other things found in this building was a fragment of an early Christian tomb slab with inscription, held to be the oldest evidence that there were already Christians on the Hunsrück in Roman times.

Building II, built about 850, was another aisleless church roughly twice the size of the earlier church, but with a baptismal facility and a gallery somewhere near the entrance.

Building III was a three-naved, flat-ceiled basilica with a semicircular apse built sometime before 1050, likewise with a baptismal facility and a west gallery. Today's churchtower was built about 1200 on the lower floor of Building III, and later made taller and more complete.

From 1460 to 1485, yet another church, the one that still stands today, was built on the foundations of the three foregoing churches, with the inside doubled in size once again. The new church was given a main portal and a porch on the south side. Among the things inside the church that are worthy of note are the stonemasons’ marks in the nave, found on pillars and ribs, the sandstone pulpit from about 1490, grave memorials from the 15th to 18th century with Catharina von Hoising's well known tomb in the quire (Master Johann von Trarbach, after 1577), the baptismal font with the combined coat of arms of the families who put forth the endowment (earlier half of the 18th century), the High Altar, the two side altars and the design of the organ pipe ranks from the latter half of the 18th century. The church's paintings were done in 1969 working from remnants that had been found and expanding thereon from historical models.

The church square around Saint Michael's Church, which until 1792 was still serving as a graveyard, is today framed on all sides by rows of houses. On the west side stands the Baroque building of the former Piarist monastery from 1765, which today serves as a rectory and a community centre. The restored coat of arms above the portal shows the arms borne by Augustus George, Margrave of Baden-Baden along with his other arms in right of his various holdings: the “Further” County of Sponheim, the County of Eberstein, the Breisgau, Badenweiler, the Margraviate of Baden, the Lordship of Üsenberg, Rötteln, Lahr, Mahlberg and the “Hinder” County of Sponheim.

=== Friedenskirche ===
The Evangelical Friedenskirche (“Peace Church”) with a community centre was built mainly to Trier architect H.O. Vogel's plans. The foundation stone was taken from the walling beside the portal at Saint Michael's Church. The baptismal font, carved from a stone worked in Roman times and unearthed during the digs under Saint Michael's, is a gift from the Catholic parish. In return, the Evangelical parish gave the Catholic parish a bronze basin for the baptismal font in the quire at Saint Michael's.

The church's organ, with 23 stops, was built by Gebr. Oberlinger Orgelbau of Windesheim near Bad Kreuznach.

The garden pavilion and the well before the Peace Church formed the centre of a walled garden about 1780, supposedly laid out by the then Badish Oberamtmann.

=== Nikolaus-Kapelle ===
The Nikolaus-Kapelle – or Saint Nicholas’s Chapel – that stands today in Kirchberg-Denzen, with its Romanesque quire tower, looks back on a long tradition: An earlier building had until 955 John the Baptist as its patron. In Ottonian times, the chapel was reconsecrated to Saint Nicholas, following what was then customary in the Rhineland.

=== Synagogue ===
The Jews who lived in Kirchberg, mainly in the time from the 18th to 20th century, together formed a religious community. They owned a small synagogue on Glöcknergasse, a religious school and their own graveyard on Metzenhausener Straße, which is still preserved.

== Politics ==
=== Town council ===
The council is made up of 20 council members, who were elected by proportional representation at the municipal election held on 7 June 2009, and the honorary mayor as chairman.

The municipal election held on 7 June 2009 yielded the following results:

| | SPD | CDU | FDP | FWG | Total |
|---|---|---|---|---|---|
| 2009 | 4 | 8 | 4 | 4 | 20 seats |
| 2004 | 4 | 9 | 2 | 5 | 20 seats |

=== Mayor ===
Kirchberg's mayor is Werner Wöllstein (FDP).

=== Coat of arms ===
The German blazon reads: Das Stadtwappen zeigt in einem spätgotischen Rundschild auf rotem Grund winkelmäßig angeordnet abwechselnd je 16 in gold und blau gehaltene Quadrate. Darunter befindet sich die gräfliche Krone.

The town's arms might in English heraldic language be described thus: Gules a chevron countercompony Or and azure throughout, in base a crown of the second.

The whole coat of arms refers to Kirchberg's former allegiance to the “Further” County of Sponheim. The chevron countercompony (that is, chequered in two rows) refers to the “chequy” arms borne by the Counts, with the squares here in the same tinctures as they were in theirs. The crown, too, refers to the town's bygone days as a Sponheim holding.

Earlier compositions of the arms also included a mural crown (that is, a crown resembling a castle wall with battlements) on top of the escutcheon; this referred to the town's old fortifications.

=== Town partnerships ===
Kirchberg fosters partnerships with the following places:

- Villeneuve-l'Archevêque, Yonne, France, a commune in Burgundy

== Culture and sightseeing ==
=== Buildings ===
The following are listed buildings or sites in Rhineland-Palatinate’s Directory of Cultural Monuments:

==== Kirchberg (main centre) ====
- Saint Michael’s Catholic Parish Church (Pfarrkirche St. Michael), Kirchplatz 12 – Late Gothic hall church, about 1490, west tower 13th century, upper floors about 1500, spire about 1700 (see also above)
- Auf der Schied 12 – watertower
- Eifelgasse (no number) – Altes Zollhaus (“Old Tollhouse”) of the Badish Truchsesserei (seneschal's office); building with hipped roof, 18th century
- Eifelgasse 1 – timber-frame house, partly solid, mansard roof, 18th century, timber-frame barn, 19th century
- Hauptstraße 39 – post office; Historicist plastered façade, mid 19th century
- At Hauptstraße 75 – staircase tower on back of house, marked 1578
- Kirchplatz – former graveyard cross, originally marked 174(?), destroyed in 1919 and renovated
- Kirchplatz 2 – former Piarist monastery; today a Catholic rectory, seven-axis Baroque building with mansard roof, marked 1765; in rectory garden a fountain
- Kirchplatz 3 – former sexton's house; timber-frame house, partly solid and slated, hipped mansard roof, marked 1754
- Kirchplatz 5 – building with hipped mansard roof, timber framing plastered, about 1800
- Kirchplatz 9 – timber-frame house, partly solid and slated, hipped mansard roof, 18th century
- Kirchplatz 1–12, Marktplatz 9–11, Hauptstraße 20, 24–36 (even numbers), (monumental zone) – tree-lined square around the Catholic parish church with rectory and former graveyard cross
- Marktplatz 4 – Schwanenapotheke (“Swans’ Pharmacy”), timber-frame house, partly solid, mid to latter half of the 17th century
- Marktplatz 5/6 – no. 5 town hall, timber-frame building, partly solid, hipped mansard roof, early 17th century, conversion in 1746; no. 6 former Haus der Weber (“Weavers’ House”), timber-frame building, partly solid, timber-frame oriel marked 1698, house possibly from the earlier half of the 17th century
- Marktplatz 7 – timber-frame house, partly solid, plastered, about 1700, mansard roof towards 1800
- Marktplatz 9 – timber-frame house, partly slated, 19th century
- Marktplatz 11 – timber-frame house, partly solid, latter half of the 17th century
- Marktplatz 1, 3–11, Hauptstraße 15–25 (odd numbers), 18 (monumental zone) – grouped round the nearly rectangular marketplace, houses, all with two floors, from the 17th to 19th century
- Oberstraße 1 – building with hipped mansard roof, partly plastered and slated, early 19th century
- Schülergasse 2 – local history museum; wedge-shaped timber-frame house, possibly from the 18th or 19th century
- Simmerner Straße – garden pavilion, polygonal Baroque plastered building, 18th century
- Jewish graveyard (monumental zone) – opened before 1850, 67 gravestones from 1865 to 1937

==== Denzen ====
- Saint Nicholas's Catholic Church (Kirche St. Nikolaus), Dumnissusstraße – Romanesque quire tower, 13th century, aisleless church, 1966, architect O. Vogel (see also above)
- Near Oststraße 24 – Baroque baptismal font, 17th century
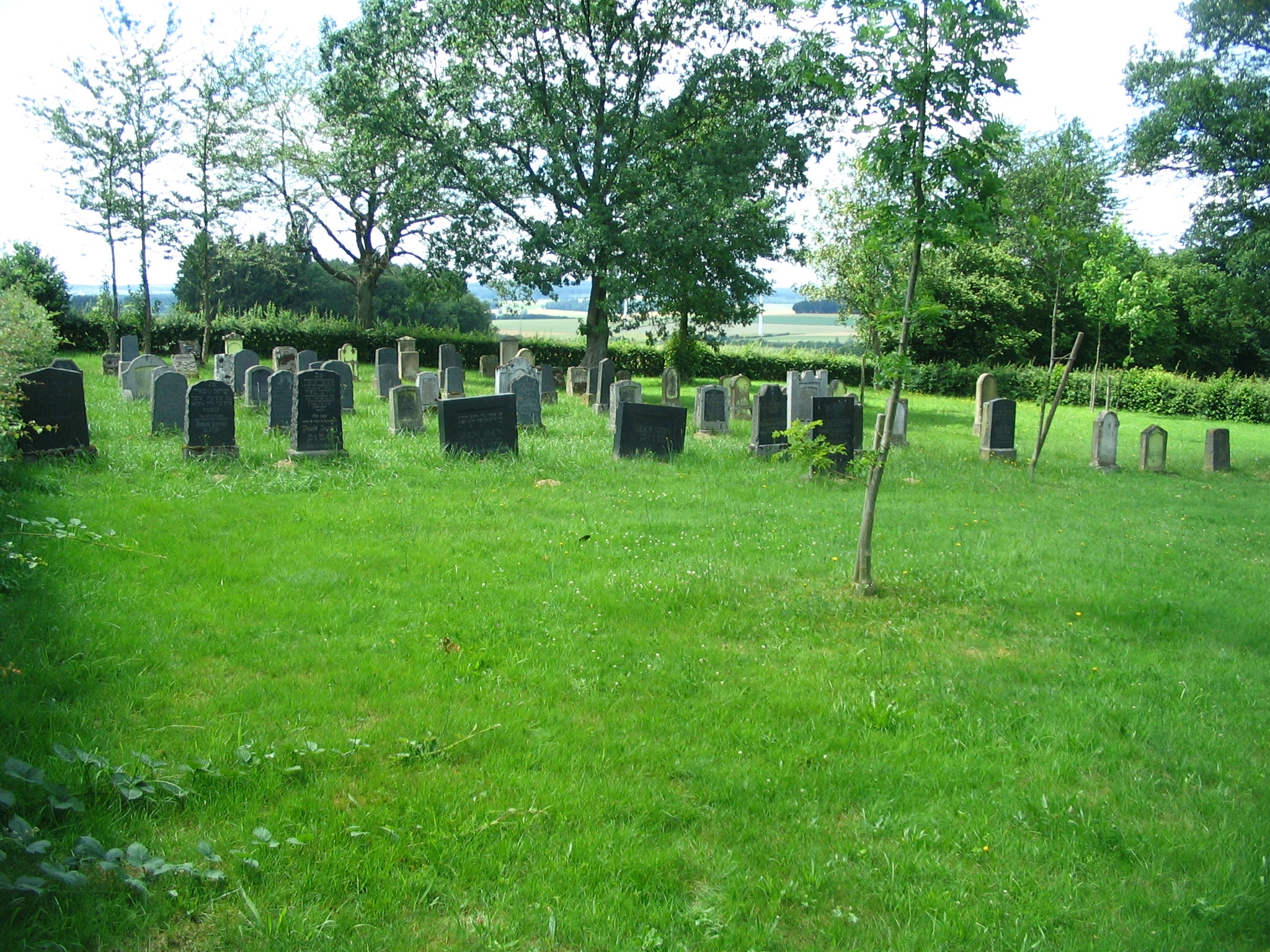
Jewish graveyard (monumental zone)

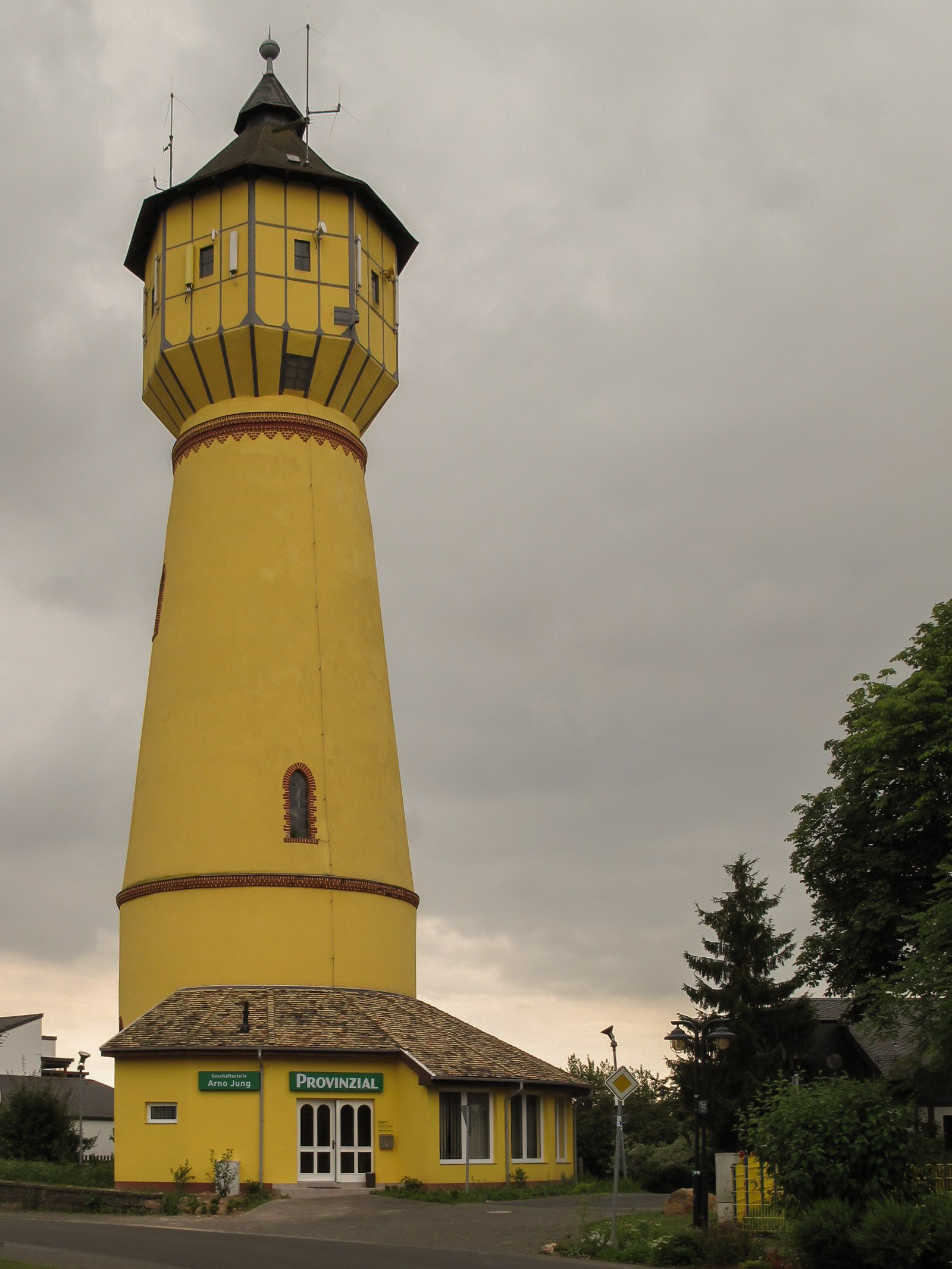
Auf der Schied 12: watertower

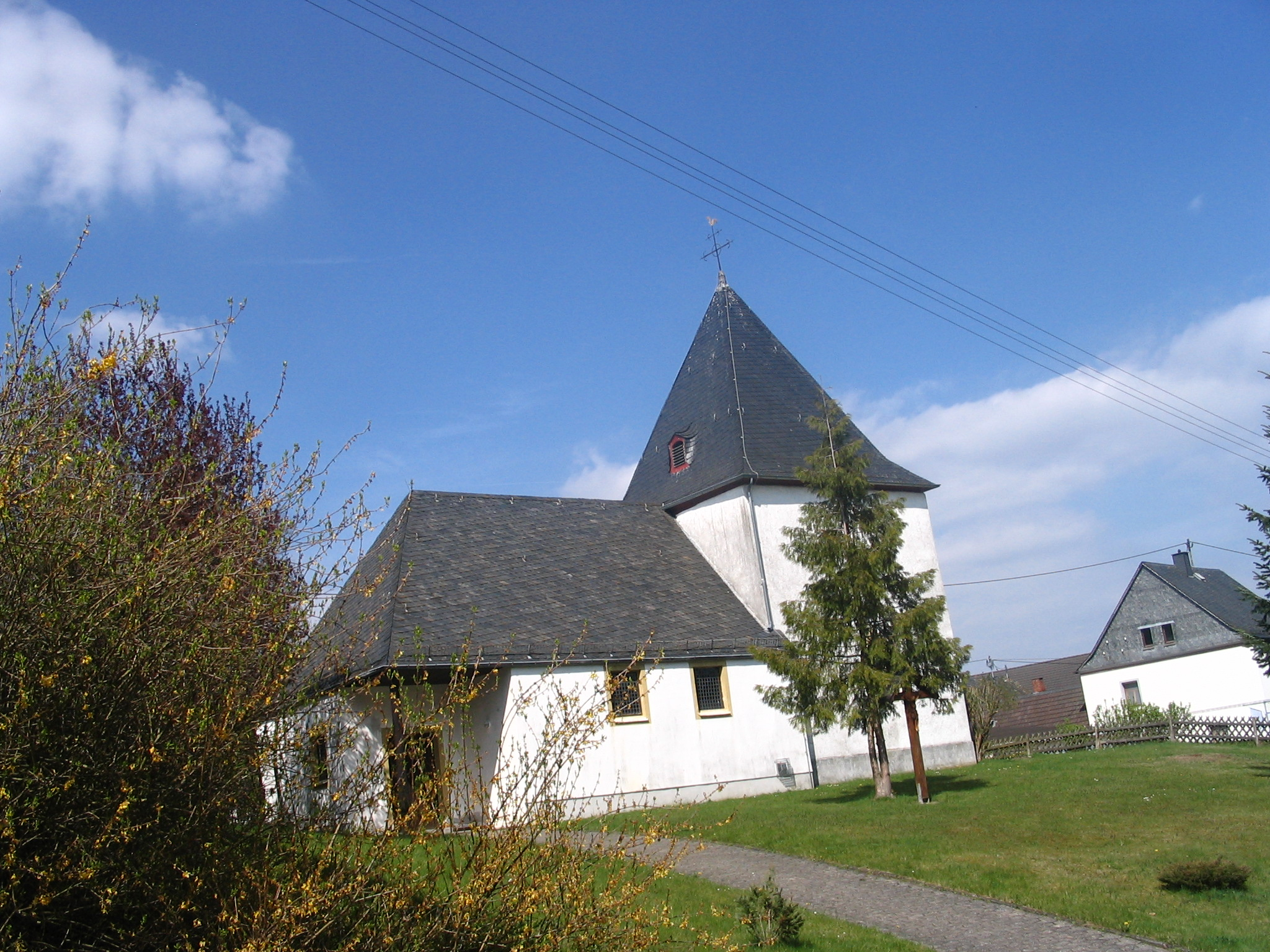
Dumnissusstraße: Saint Nicholas's Catholic Church

Other buildings and sites worth seeing are:

- the historical Roman fountain in the outlying centre of Denzen;
- the youth centre “Am Zug”, an interdenominational meeting place for youth with all-day supervision sponsored by the club “we-SHARE”, which is involved in international humanitarian endeavours.

=== Museums ===
The Kirchberger Heimatmuseum (local history museum) on Eifelgasse gives the visitor an impression of the townsfolk's lives in bygone centuries.

=== Old pictures of the town ===
In both the important collections of town portraits from the 17th century, the one by Daniel Meisner and Eberhard Kieser entitled Thesaurus philopoliticus (“Political Treasure Chest”) and also the one by Matthäus Merian entitled Topographia Germaniae, are found copper engravings of Kirchberg. The former image, from 1623, was actually done by copper engraver Sebastian Furck, as witnessed by the Latin signature SF fecit (“SF made it”).

The second town portrait, by Matthäus Merian, comes from 1645. In the accompanying description, it says of Kirchberg: “Ist nicht groß, aber vor diesem Krieg fein erbaut gewesen”, or “Is not big, but before this war (meaning the Thirty Years' War) was nicely built”.

An oil painting of Kirchberg from before 1610 is only preserved in old photographs. Also most instructive about the town's history are three town plans from 1635, 1655 and 1688.

=== Sport and leisure ===
Kirchberg has both an indoor and an outdoor swimming pool, a tennis hall, the open youth centre “Am Zug” and an indoor climbing hall.

The Freiherr von Drais Radweg (“Baron von Drais Cycle Path”) leads in a loop round the town for 14 km. The Lützelsoon-Radweg, another cycle path, to Kirn, begins in Kirchberg. Moreover, there are a sport club called TuS Kirchberg 1909 and a handball club called HSV Kirchberg 1974.

== Economy and infrastructure ==
=== Transport ===
Kirchberg lies at the crossing of two old highways: Trier-Kirchberg-Bingen-Mainz (now Bundesstraße 50) and Middle Moselle-Nahe (now Bundesstraße 421). Since 1990, the inner town has been spared heavy traffic by the B 50 bypass. Foreseen for the railway line, the Hunsrückquerbahn (Langenlonsheim-Stromberg-Rheinböllen-Simmern-Kirchberg-Hermeskeil), is at least partial reactivation to serve Frankfurt-Hahn Airport, although for the time being it still lies idle.

West of the town, 12 km away, lies Frankfurt-Hahn Airport with international connections.

=== Education ===
The town of Kirchberg has a primary school, a Hauptschule and a Realschule.

== Famous people ==
=== Sons and daughters of the town ===
- Otto Back (1834–1917), district chairman in Simmern, Mayor of Strasbourg (now in France; then Straßburg, Germany), Landtag president

== Further reading (in chronological order) ==
- Jakob Göhl: Aus Kirchbergs Vergangenheit; Kirchberg 1949
- Albert Rosenkranz: Kirchberg, eine kleine Geschichte der evgl. Gemeinde dieser vordersponheimischen Oberamtsstadt; Simmern 1959
- Hans Eiden, Norbert Müller-Dietrich, Ferdinand Pauly u.a.: St. Michael in Kirchberg. Geschichte – Grabung – Gestalt; Kirchberg 1969
- Karl Faller: Kirchberg, älteste Stadt des Hunsrücks; Simmern 1974
- Magnus Backes, Hans Caspary, Norbert Müller-Dietrich: Die Kunstdenkmäler des Rhein-Hunsrück-Kreises, Teil 1: Ehemaliger Kreis Simmern; München 1977 (mit ausführlichen Literaturnachweisen)
- J. Kalb: Der Marktplatz in Kirchberg – Stadtbaukunst auf dem Hunsrück; in: Rheinische Heimatpflege N.F. 18 (1981), S. 179 ff.
- Hans Georg Wehrens: St. Michael in Kirchberg/Hunsrück; München 1983
- Wolfgang Seibrich: Zur Geschichte der Pfarrei St. Michael in Kirchberg; Vortragsmanuskript vom 27. September 1985 (Katholisches Pfarrarchiv)
- Hans Georg Wehrens: Das badische Wappen am Portal des ehemaligen Piaristenklosters in Kirchberg; in: Hunsrücker Heimatblätter 1988, S. 169 ff.
- Willi Wagner, Alfred Bauer, Peter Casper, Hans Dunger: 1000 Jahre Denzen 995–1995; Kirchberg 1995
- Hans Georg Wehrens, Willi Wagner: Kirchberg im Hunsrück; Rheinische Kunststätten Heft 46; Köln 1997^{2}
- Alfred Bauer, Hans Dunger: Das römische Kirchberg; Schriftenreihe zur Geschichte der Stadt Kirchberg Band 1; Kirchberg 1999
- Hans Dunger, Willi Wagner: 875 Jahre Ersterwähnung von Kirchberg; Schriftenreihe zur Geschichte der Stadt Kirchberg Band 5; Kirchberg 2002
- Hans Dunger: Kirchberg um die Jahrtausendwende – Erinnerungen eines Hunsrücker Stadtbürgermeisters; Schriftenreihe zur Geschichte der Stadt Kirchberg Band 8; Kirchberg 2006
- Hans Dunger: Die Kirchberger Bürgermeister seit 1800; Schriftenreihe zur Geschichte der Stadt Kirchberg Band 11; Kirchberg 2009
