= Felke =

Felke is a surname. Notable people with the surname include:

- Aloys Felke (1927–1997), German politician and furniture manufacturer
- Emanuel Felke (1856–1926), German Protestant pastor and naturopath
- Günter Felke (1929–2005), German furniture manufacturer, numismatist and patron of culture
- Michael Felke (1895–1977), German furniture manufacturer
- Petra Felke (born 1959), German track and field athlete

== See also ==
- Felke Möbelwerke, German furniture factory
