= Dill, Germany =

Dill
- Municipality
- Coat of arms

- Location of Dill within Rhein-Hunsrück-Kreis district
- Interactive map of Dill
- Location within Germany Location within Rhineland-Palatinate
- Coordinates: 49°54′58.44″N 7°20′49.1″E
- Country: Germany
- State: Rhineland-Palatinate
- District: Rhein-Hunsrück-Kreis
- Municipal assoc.: Kirchberg

Government
  - Mayor (2019–24): Gundolf Kurz

Area
  - Total: 5.55 km^{2} (2.14 sq mi)
- Elevation: 356 m (1,168 ft)

Population (2025-12-31)
  - Total: 212
  - Density: 38.2/km^{2} (98.9/sq mi)
- Time zone: UTC+01:00 (CET)
  - Summer (DST): UTC+02:00 (CEST)
- Postal codes: 55487
- Dialling codes: 06763
- Vehicle registration: SIM
- Website: www.gemeinde-dill.de

Dill (German pronunciation: [dɪl]) is an Ortsgemeinde – a municipality belonging to a Verbandsgemeinde, a kind of collective municipality – in the Rhein-Hunsrück-Kreis (district) in Rhineland-Palatinate, Germany. It belongs to the Verbandsgemeinde of Kirchberg, whose seat is in the like-named town, and it is home to a castle ruin that bears the same name.

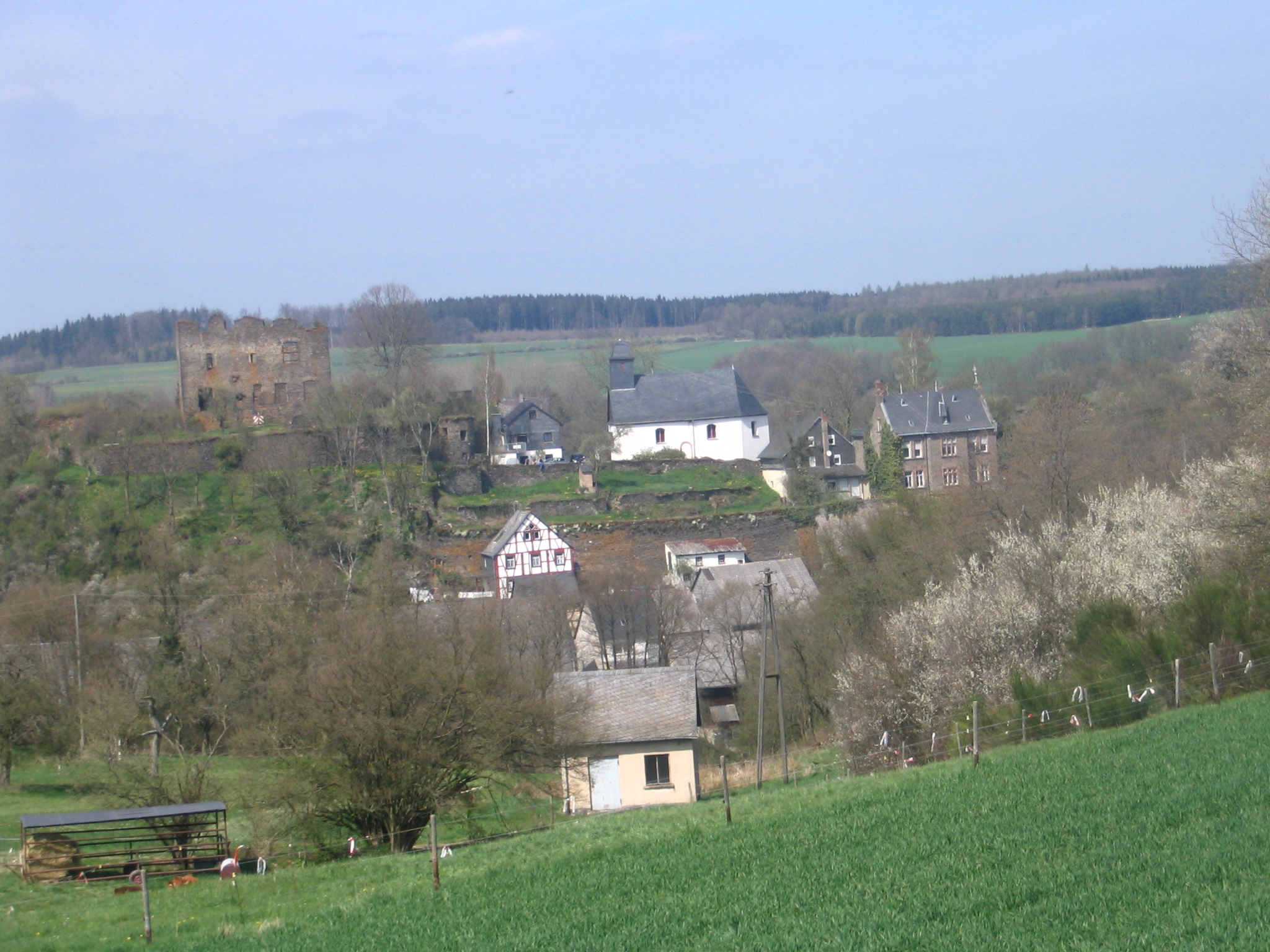
Dill seen from the south

== Geography ==
=== Location ===
The municipality lies in the Hunsrück in the Dillerbach valley, which cuts some 30 m into the Hunsrück plateau as it flows along a bow round a mountain spur upon which sits the castle. Parts of the village also stretch across the spur's south slope and the saddle, which links the spur to the plateau to the east. Two kilometres to the village's east, the Sohrbach empties into the Kyrbach. Through the north of the municipal area runs the old Roman road, the so-called Via Ausonia (or Ausoniusstraße in German).

== History ==
Dill's first confirmed documentary mention comes from 1107, when Adalbert, comes (“Count”) de Dille appeared as one of the witnesses in the founding document of Springiersbach Monastery. This was Adalbert II, Count of Mörsberg and Dill (b. about 1070; d. 30 August 1125) from the comital family of Nellenburg, who lived on Lake Constance’s western shores. Adalbert had holdings from his great-grandmother’s inheritance in the Nahegau, among which was Dill. Adalbert’s daughter Mechtild von Mörsberg wed Menginhard von Sponheim, thus bringing Dill into the County of Sponheim.

Between 1223 and 1237, the Sponheims’ territory was split in two, forming a “Further County” (vordere Grafschaft) and a “Hinder County” (hintere Grafschaft). Nevertheless, Dill was not specifically assigned to either, and was held by both comital lines jointly, as was the Sponheims’ seat, Castle Sponheim. In the years that followed, Castle Dill served more than once as a widow's seat or a younger son's seat. In 1329, during the Schmidtburg Feud, Dill was besieged by Archbishop Baldwin of Trier, and in the end, he took it over. In 1338, however, the Archbishopric gave the village back to the Sponheims, enfeoffing them with it.

Under Count Johann V, the Sponheims’ last male heir, Dill was granted town rights on 8 January 1427 along with leave to hold a weekly market and two yearly markets as well. Furthermore, Dill was the seat of a small Amt. Despite these special rights, Dill could not develop any functions befitting a central town. The nearby town of Kirchberg had a more favourable location on the trade roads and had already been granted town rights in 1259. Together with the small size of the Amt, which at first stretched no farther than Dill itself although by the 17th century it also included the neighbouring village of Sohrschied, these factors saw to it that Dill never measured up to the stature of a small town, and in the end it lost the title.

In the Nine Years' War (known in Germany as the Pfälzischer Erbfolgekrieg, or War of the Palatine Succession), Castle Dill was destroyed in 1697 by a French army under General Ezéchiel du Mas, Comte de Mélac. As a result of Evangelical Pastor Christoph Besold's intercession, the village itself was spared destruction.

When the County was finally dissolved and divided up, Dill passed in 1776 to the Margraviate of Baden. The small Amt, too, was dissolved and Dill became part of the Amt of Kirchberg. During the Napoleonic occupation, Dill belonged to the Mairie (“Mayoralty”) of Sohren. In 1815 it was assigned to the Kingdom of Prussia at the Congress of Vienna and thereby became part of the Rhine Province. It also became part of the Simmern district. Since 1946, it has been part of the then newly founded state of Rhineland-Palatinate.

=== Castle Dill ===
It is not known with any certainty when Burg Dill was built, but it is assumed that this happened in the 11th century, and that it might have been built on the ruins of an earlier Roman or Celtic complex.

At the complex's highest point, in the north, is the Oberburg (“upper castle”). Not much of the four-floor residential tower, whose sides measured 18 × 12 m, is left other than three outside walls; the east wall is missing. On the north wall's outer side is a garderobe. Parts of the barrel-vaulted cellar may still be visited. West of the upper castle, remnants of the girding wall have been unearthed. They exhibit a herringbone pattern in their construction.

On the area of the Niederburg (“lower castle” or “bailey”) to the east stand an Evangelical church, built on the spot where the castle chapel once stood, a wellhouse, which has been expanded into a holiday home, and a modern house.

Of the Vorburg (“forward castle” or perhaps “outer bailey”) to the west and south, only remnants of the foundations and outer wall can still be found. Part of the area is used as a garden.

The castle is in private ownership and normally cannot be visited. However, once or twice a year, there are guided tours. The times are published.

== Politics ==
=== Municipal council ===
The council is made up of 6 council members, who were elected by majority vote at the municipal election held on 7 June 2009, and the honorary mayor as chairman.

=== Mayor ===
Dill's mayor is Gundolf Kurz.

=== Coat of arms ===
The German blazon reads: In gespaltenem Schilde vorn von Silber und Rot in 5 Reihen geschacht, belegt mit aufrechtem goldenem Schlüssel mit viereckigem Griff und einwärts gekehrtem Bart mit Kreuzeinschnitt, hinten in Blau schwebend ein gezinnter, goldener Burgturm mit rotem Spitzdach und goldenem Knauf, offenem Tor und zwei übereinanderliegenden offenen Fensterluken.

The municipality's arms might in English heraldic language be described thus: Per pale chequy of ten argent and gules a key palewise, the bow to base and the wards to sinister, Or, and azure a castle tower embattled of the third with conical roof of the second with a pommel of the third, an open gate and two windows in pale.

The silver and red “chequy” pattern charged with the golden key on the dexter (armsbearer's right, viewer's left) side refers to the granting of town and freedom rights in 1427 by Johann V of the “Hinder” County of Sponheim. The golden castle tower on the sinister (armsbearer's left, viewer's right) side refers to Castle Dill, while the tinctures on this side represent the “Further” County of Sponheim.

== Culture and sightseeing ==
=== Buildings ===
The following are listed buildings or sites in Rhineland-Palatinate’s Directory of Cultural Monuments:

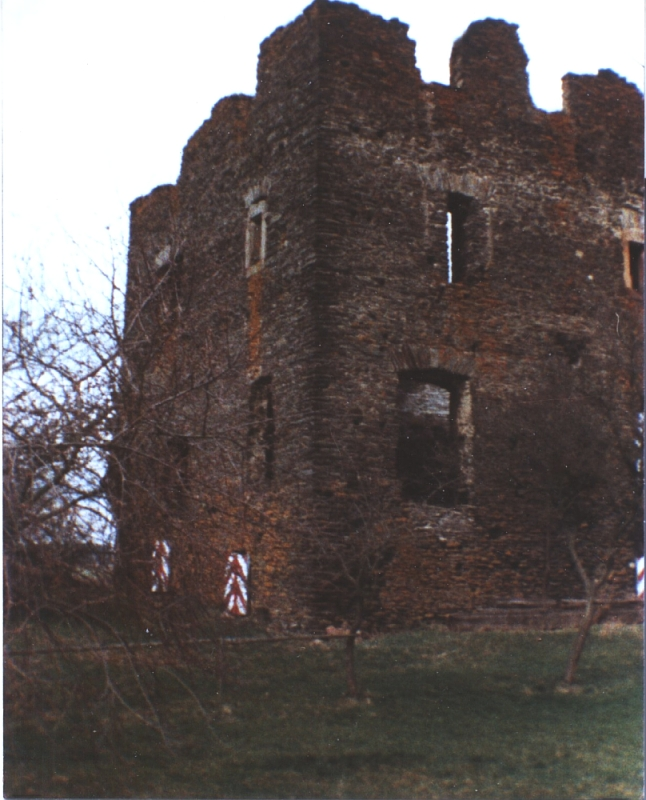
Zur Burg: Dill castle ruin

- Castle and village (monumental zone) – The monumental zone comprises the centrepiece, the castle ruin, the Evangelical church with rectory (protected by regulation dated 16 January 1981) and the surrounding houses along Dorfstraße (nos. 7-35).
- Castle ruin, Zur Burg – upper castle with 2½-floor residential tower, mid 14th century, lower castle with former castle chapel, outer bailey with castle path
- Evangelical church, Zur Burg 5 – Baroque aisleless church, about 1700, tracery from earlier building, 16th century (see also below)
- Backesweg (no number) – timber-frame house, 19th century
- Backesweg 3 – timber-frame house, partly solid, 19th century
- Dorfstraße 7 – Quereinhaus (a combination residential and commercial house divided for these two purposes down the middle, perpendicularly to the street), timber-frame, partly slated, half-hipped roof, 19th century; whole complex of buildings with timber-frame barns
- Dorfstraße 9 – timber-frame house, 18th century, marked 1842
- Dorfstraße 10 – timber-frame house with knee wall, late 19th century, timber-frame barns, marked 1892; whole complex of buildings
- Dorfstraße 11 – timber-frame house with knee wall, marked 1848
- Dorfstraße 19 – timber-frame house, partly solid, half-hipped roof, 18th century
- Dorfstraße 22 – timber-frame house with knee wall, late 19th century
- Dorfstraße 25 – building with half-hipped roof, timber framing plastered, about 1800
- At Dorfstraße 29 – door, marked 1877
- Dorfstraße 35 – timber-frame house with knee wall, latter half of the 19th century; whole complex of buildings with timber-frame barns
- Zur Burg (no number) – bakehouse, one-floor plastered building, 18th or 19th century
- Zur Burg 2 – house
- Zur Burg 3 – Evangelical rectory; Gothic Revival quarrystone building
- Zur Burg 8 – timber-frame house, 18th century

The small Evangelical church was built in 1701 on the same site as the old castle chapel, even using some of the older building's material. Inside are paintings by church painter Johann Georg Engisch from 1714. From 1715 to 1878, the church had an organ from the Stumm organ-building family's workshop, built by Moezenius. It was later replaced with an Oberlinger organ.

On the Via Ausonia, 1 km north of the village, stands a reconstructed Roman watchtower. Nearby is a barbecue pavilion where Roman children's games can be played.

== Economy and infrastructure ==
=== Transport ===
Dill is linked over four Kreisstraßen (District Roads) to the neighbouring municipalities of Niedersohren (and on to Sohren), Dillendorf (and on to Kirchberg), Sohrschied and Laufersweiler.

In the outermost northeast, Dill's municipal area borders on the abandoned Hunsrückquerbahn (“Cross-Hunsrück Railway”). Irregularly, but several times a day, buses on Rhein-Mosel Verkehrsgesellschaft route 664 run to Simmern, Kirchberg, Sohren and Büchenbeuren. Also, there is some busing to schools and kindergartens in neighbouring municipalities.

Seven kilometres northwest of Dill lies Frankfurt-Hahn Airport.
