= Bärenbach, Rhein-Hunsrück =

Bärenbach
- Municipality
- Coat of arms

- Location of Bärenbach within Rhein-Hunsrück-Kreis district
- Interactive map of Bärenbach
- Location within Germany Location within Rhineland-Palatinate
- Coordinates: 49°56′49.87″N 7°17′3.74″E
- Country: Germany
- State: Rhineland-Palatinate
- District: Rhein-Hunsrück-Kreis
- Municipal assoc.: Kirchberg

Government
  - Mayor (2019–24): Thomas Müller

Area
  - Total: 4.83 km^{2} (1.86 sq mi)
- Elevation: 445 m (1,460 ft)

Population (2025-12-31)
  - Total: 464
  - Density: 96.1/km^{2} (249/sq mi)
- Time zone: UTC+01:00 (CET)
  - Summer (DST): UTC+02:00 (CEST)
- Postal codes: 55483
- Dialling codes: 06543
- Vehicle registration: SIM
- Website: Bärenbach

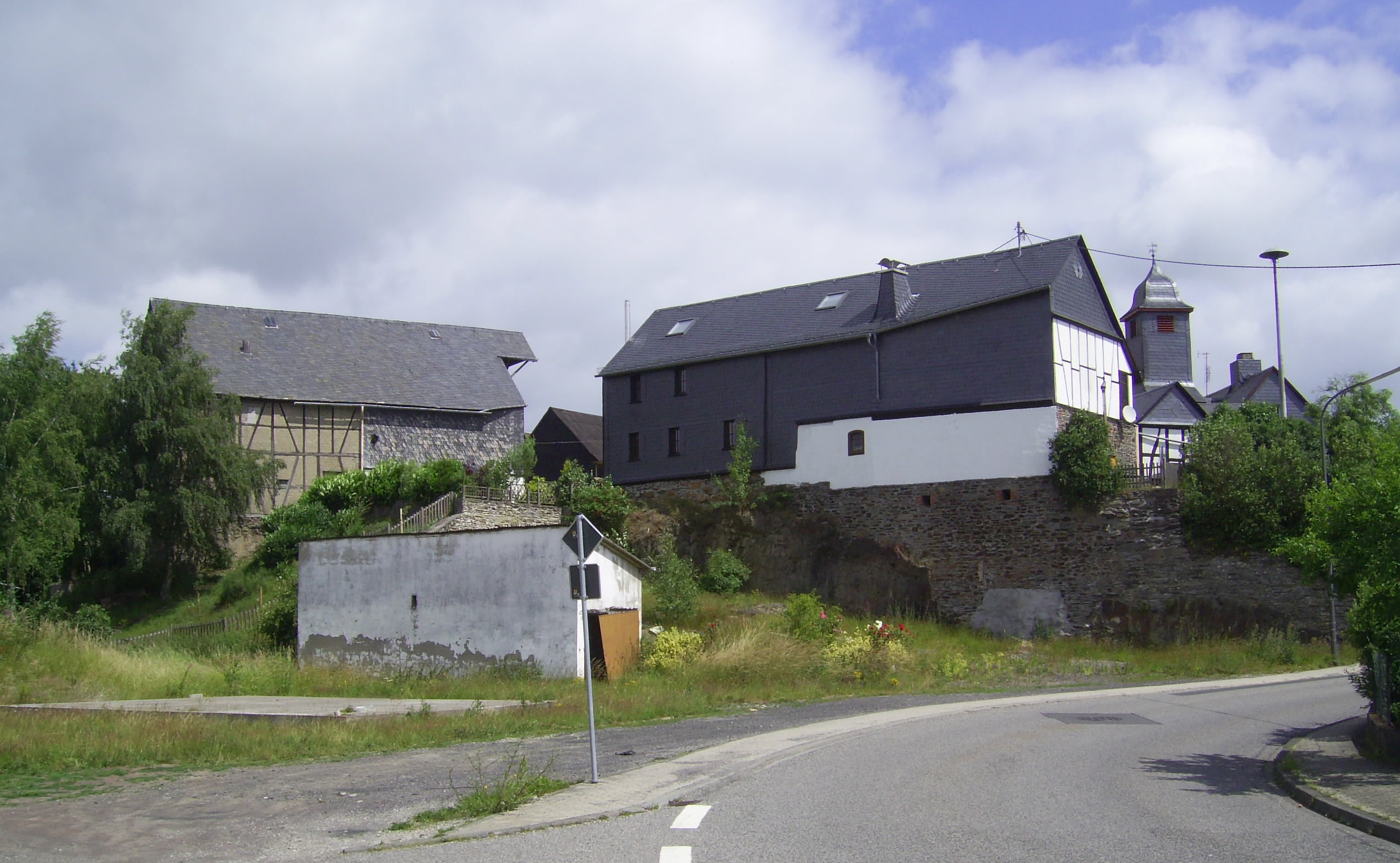
Older buildings in the village centre

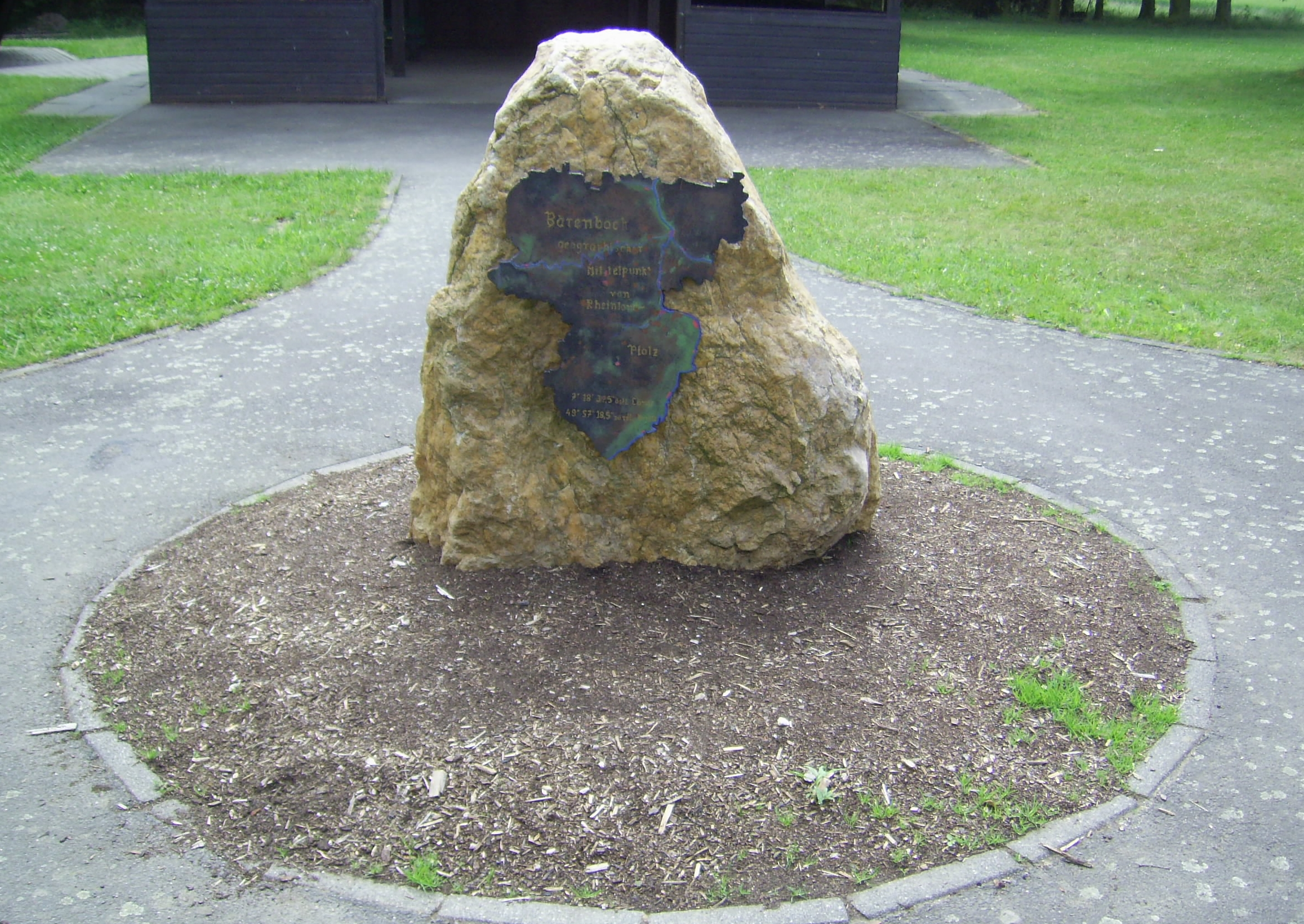
Monument stone at Rhineland-Palatinate's geographical midpoint

Bärenbach (German pronunciation: [ˈbɛːʁənbax]) is an Ortsgemeinde – a municipality belonging to a Verbandsgemeinde, a kind of collective municipality – in the Rhein-Hunsrück-Kreis (district) in Rhineland-Palatinate, Germany. It belongs to the Verbandsgemeinde of Kirchberg, whose seat is in the like-named town.

== Geography ==
=== Location ===
The municipality lies in the Hunsrück about 1 km east of the river Nahe.

Rhineland-Palatinate's geographical midpoint is found within Bärenbach's municipal limits. A stone marks the spot at precisely 49°57′18.5″N 7°18′37.5″E where the midpoint lies.

== History ==
=== Middle Ages and early modern times ===
In 1103, Bärenbach had its first documentary mention. Between 1234 and 1437, Bärenbach belonged to the Upper Rhenish Circle, the Margraviate of Baden, the “Further” County of Sponheim and the Oberamt of Kirchberg. In this time, the Counts of Sponheim shared their holdings out in a “Further” County and a “Hinder” County. To the Oberamt of Kirchberg in the “Further” County belonged Altlay, Bärenbach, Belg, Büchenbeuren, Hahn, Niedersohren, Niederweiler, Rödelhausen, Sohren, Wahlenau and Würrich.

In 1437, the comital House of Sponheim died out in the male line, and thereafter, Bärenbach belonged to the Margraviate of Baden, Electorate of the Palatinate (Kreuznach). Over the next 355 years from 1437 to 1792, the counts’ titles changed often: Margrave at Baden, Count Palatine, Count of Beldenz. The counts’ lordship, however, was definitively swept away in 1813 after the French Revolutionary Wars by the French. In 1816 the area passed to the Kingdom of Prussia at the Congress of Vienna.

=== First World War ===
Fifty-six men from Bärenbach were called into the military in the First World War. In the war's later years, Russian prisoners of war were detailed to help out with agricultural work, which was greatly needed, for so many local men were away at the fighting. With the German Army's retreat between 16 and 30 November 1917, military personnel of all kinds were quartered in the village for days in great numbers. In early December, the French marched in and occupied the area. There was no permanent occupation in Bärenbach. French troops were quartered in the village for eight days and American troops for only one. Curfew was nine o’clock in the evening and travel without photograph identification was forbidden.

Fourteen men from Bärenbach fell in the war, and one went missing in action in France.

=== Third Reich and Second World War ===
When Adolf Hitler came to power in 1933, Nazi organizations were set up in Bärenbach as they were elsewhere in Germany. Among others maintaining a presence were the Hitler Youth (Hitlerjugend – HJ), the League of German Girls (Bund Deutscher Mädel – BDM) and the National Socialist People's Welfare (Nationalsozialistische Volkswohlfahrt – NSV). The Party's Local Group Leader (Ortsgruppenleiter) was Reinhold Barth. The Hitler Youth leader was at first Rudolf Bolz and then later Walter Schuch, followed by Ernst Müller and then Kurt Bonn. The Deutsches Jungvolk leader was Hans Weckmann, and the BDM leader was Else Litz (or Else Bonn after her marriage). The NS-Frauenschaft leader was Emma Spehr, and later Emilie Barth. The NSV leader was Reinhold Barth, and later Johann Weckmann.

In May 1938, the old schoolhouse was converted into a Party house. Furthermore, the locally well known garden, until now known as the Kaisergarten, was dubbed the Adolf Hitler Garten. An oak tree was planted to mark this occasion, and a torchlight parade was held. Later, the French dug the oak out and removed the document and the coins buried underneath as war booty. In April 1939, an NSV kindergarten was established in the village.

In September 1939 came war. The handwritten village chronicle actually says: “Poland declared war on us first” (Zuerst erklärte uns Polen den Krieg). This was, of course, a lie. During the 18-day Polish Campaign came the first quartering of German troops in Bärenbach.

On 24 May 1940, a great bomb fell on the Sohren municipal area, causing considerable damage. In Kirchberg, an airfield was established. Outgoing aircraft flying westwards overflew Bärenbach. Older people were unsettled by all the aircraft, but youngsters waved at them. Allied fliers, for their part, dropped leaflets in the night in an attempt to unsettle the German populace.

In 1941, the RAF began dropping small incendiary devices known to Germans as Brandplättchen. Such a drop took place on the night of 24 July 1941. This was followed by a hunt for any of those that had not ignited. Some were found. The importance of blackout was impressed on the people.

By 1943, local people's kin, and unrelated people, too, from bigger centres began arriving in Bärenbach seeking shelter from air raids; some had been left homeless.

On 2 February 1943, the German Sixth Army in Stalingrad capitulated. Six days later, a gathering was held in the street in Bärenbach to thank the German soldiers for their efforts. On the night of 4 and 5 October 1943, Allied aircraft overflew the village. Even the next day, many planes were seen. The next night, an Allied flier had to make an emergency landing. Before the aircraft exploded, it dropped a bomb on Sohren's outlying countryside. The aircraft crashed in Winterbach, scattering engine parts everywhere. Only two of the crew escaped safely and were captured. They turned out to be Canadians.

In 1944, a nightwatch was begun in Bärenbach to warn of any impending airstrikes. Rooms were set up for the watchmen at the Party house. Early on 30 January 1944, Allied aircraft flew in droves over Bärenbach. German fighters were sent to defend against them. It was not quite 11 o’clock in the morning when the sound of the aircraft's guns burst out overhead. One plane was shot down in the exchange; the German fighter pilot crashed between Bärenbach and Würrich and was badly wounded, dying a short while later.

In September, a Flak unit was stationed in the village. On 30 September 1944, tank traps were built in Bärenbach. With the onset of the Battle of the Bulge on 16 December 1944 came the stationing of Panzer and intelligence personnel in Bärenbach.

On 2 January 1945, Hahn was bombed with the loss of six lives, and further, almost every house was in some way damaged. Meanwhile, in Bärenbach, the number of evacuees from Prüm, Trier and Bonn had risen to 58. On 5 March, the woods near the village were bombed, probably because some forest workers had lit a fire to warm their dinner. Nobody was hurt. Nor were there any casualties when Bärenbach came under fire from an Allied fighter-bomber on 15 March, although several houses were shot up, one of which caught fire.

On 18 March 1945, the war ended, at least for Bärenbach. An American tank came into the village from the Hunsrückhöhenstraße (“Hunsrück Heights Road”, a scenic road across the Hunsrück built originally as a military road on Hermann Göring’s orders). Bärenbach sustained no further damage, and there was no fighting.

=== Postwar era ===
In January 1946, the military authorities ordered a census, which yielded a population figure of 282 for Bärenbach, including the evacuees. The Nazi Local Group Leader (Ortsgruppenleiter), Reinhold Barth, was seized and taken to Idar-Oberstein, but he was released after six months. Erich Herrmann, too, was arrested and taken away to Diez. He had just been released from a prisoner-of-war camp, but was under suspicion because he had served with the Waffen-SS. Two women were arrested and imprisoned in Traben-Trarbach for allegedly burying in the woods a military weapon that they had found in a barn. One was released three months later, but the other was kept in prison longer.

Nature, too, brought misfortune to Bärenbach. A hailstorm wiped out between 70 and 75% of the local harvest. A further 10% was claimed by the local wild swine. In 1947, an unusually hot summer whose temperatures reached 50 °C, and its attendant drought, wrought further havoc with agriculture, both endangering livestock and reducing harvests to fractions of their usual levels (and in some cases, even to nothing); potatoes in some places were shrunk to the size of walnuts.

In 1946, Bärenbach became part of the then newly founded state of Rhineland-Palatinate. The following year, the state’s government took power, although the Federal Republic had not yet been founded.

In 1980, the United States Air Force demanded that the municipality of Bärenbach hand over 53 ha of land needed for use in the establishment of its “Roland” surface-to-air-missile defence system to be installed at, among other places, the nearby Hahn Air Base. The municipal council, backed by CDU Member of the Landtag (state legislature) Walter Mallmann, refused to comply.

Flurbereinigung was being undertaken at this time as well, after having begun in 1977.

On 1 December 1982, the mood at a village festival was somewhat dampened by the news that an F-16 jet from Hahn Air Base had crashed. The base commander, who was a guest at the festival, quickly left and hurried to the scene. However, he came back later with the news that the pilot had not been too badly injured.

== Politics ==
=== Municipal council ===
The council is made up of 8 council members, who were elected at the municipal election held on 7 June 2009, and the honorary mayor as chairman.

=== Mayor ===
Bärenbach’s mayor is Thomas Müller.

=== Coat of arms ===
The German blazon reads: Geteilt von einer schräglinken blauen Wellenleiste. Oben in Silber ein steigender, linksgewendeter, rotbewehrter und rotgezungter schwarzer Bär. Unten geschacht von Gold und Blau.

The municipality’s arms might in English heraldic language be described thus: A bend sinister wavy azure between argent a bear rampant sinister sable armed and langued gules and chequy of twenty Or and azure.

The bend sinister wavy (slanted wavy stripe) refers to the village’s namesake stream, the Bärenbach. The bear is a canting charge, referring to the municipality’s name (Bär is German for “bear”, and Bären is the form it takes in the oblique cases). The “chequy” part of the arms is from the coat of arms formerly borne by the Counts of Sponheim.

== Culture and sightseeing ==
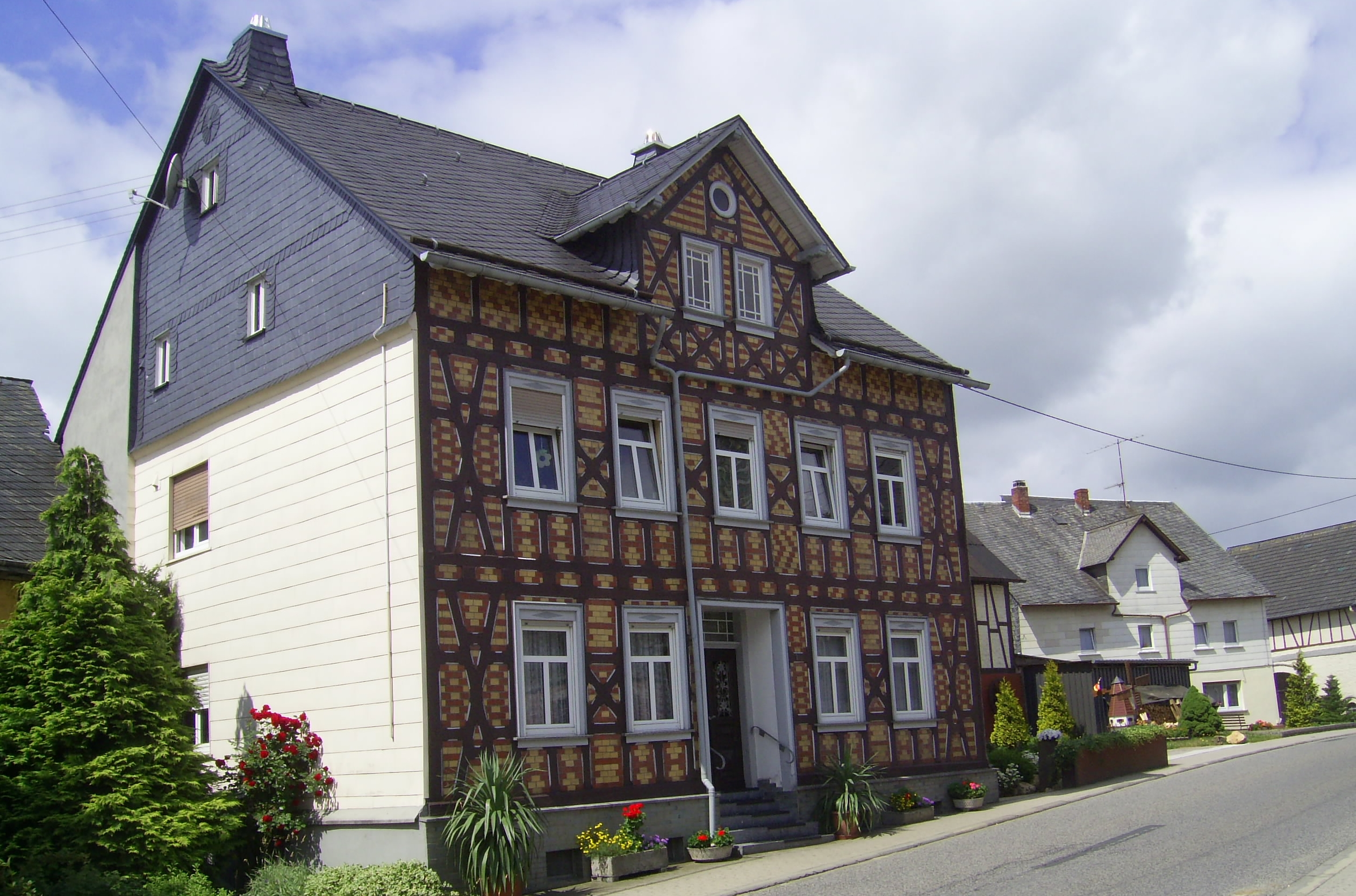
Hahner Straße 1: timber-frame house

=== Buildings ===
The following are listed buildings or sites in Rhineland-Palatinate’s Directory of Cultural Monuments:

- Hahner Straße 1 – timber-frame house, brick partitions, marked 1901, barn; whole complex of buildings
