= Sohren =

- Municipality
- Coat of arms

- Location of Sohren within Rhein-Hunsrück-Kreis district
- Interactive map of Sohren
- Location within Germany Location within Rhineland-Palatinate
- Coordinates: 49°55′57″N 7°18′29″E
- Country: Germany
- State: Rhineland-Palatinate
- District: Rhein-Hunsrück-Kreis
- Municipal assoc.: Kirchberg

Government
  - Mayor (2019–24): Markus Bongard (CDU)

Area
  - Total: 9.42 km^{2} (3.64 sq mi)
- Elevation: 410 m (1,350 ft)

Population (2025-12-31)
  - Total: 3,194
  - Density: 339/km^{2} (878/sq mi)
- Time zone: UTC+01:00 (CET)
  - Summer (DST): UTC+02:00 (CEST)
- Postal codes: 55487
- Dialling codes: 06543
- Vehicle registration: SIM

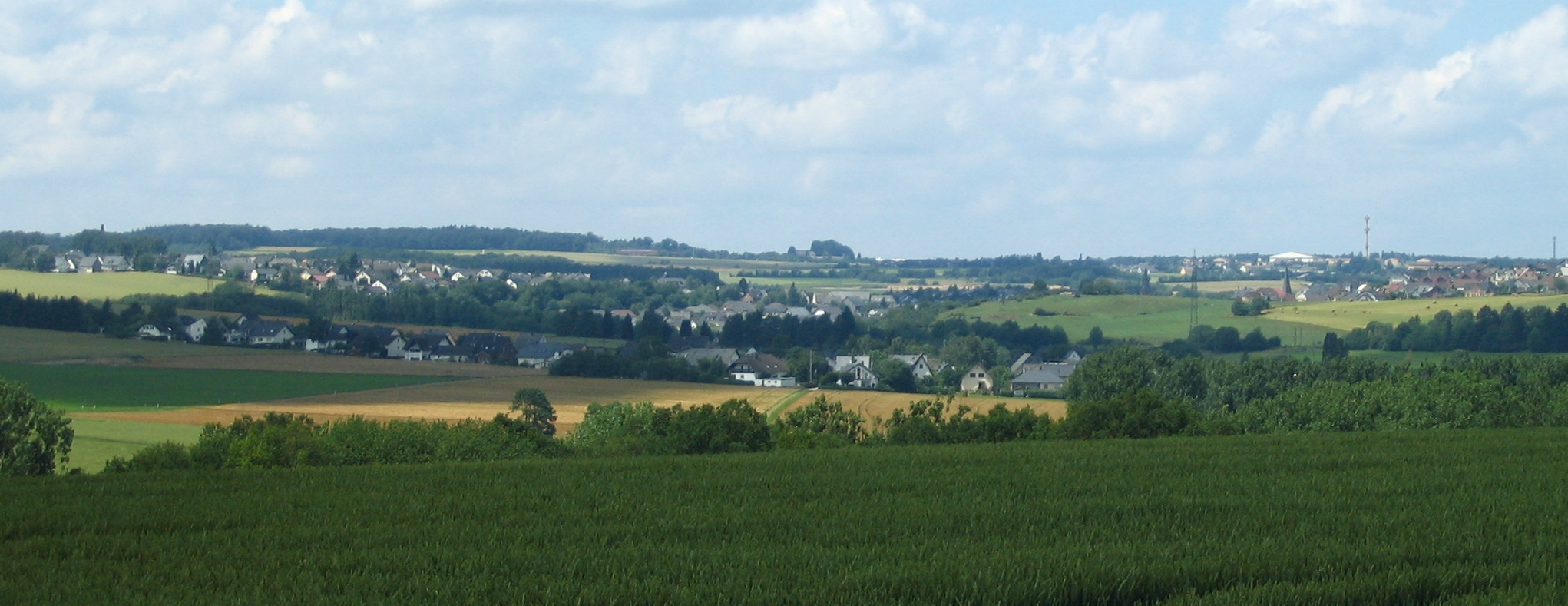
Hunsrück countryside with Sohren in the middle, in the foreground: Niedersohren, in the background: Frankfurt-Hahn Airport

Sohren (German pronunciation: [ˈzoːʁən]) is an Ortsgemeinde – a municipality belonging to a Verbandsgemeinde, a kind of collective municipality – in the Rhein-Hunsrück-Kreis (district) in Rhineland-Palatinate, Germany. It belongs to the Verbandsgemeinde of Kirchberg, whose seat is in the like-named town. Sohren is a state-recognized tourism resort (Fremdenverkehrsort) and is set out in state planning as a lower centre.

== Geography ==
=== Location ===
The municipality lies in the central Hunsrück and precisely in the centre of the state of Rhineland-Palatinate. North of Sohren runs Bundesstraße 50, and 2 km (1 mi) northwest lies Frankfurt-Hahn Airport. Sohren lies roughly 6 km (4 mi) west of Kirchberg. Eight kilometres to the southwest is the edge of the Idarwald. Through the village runs the Grundbach, also known as the Dillerbach and the Sohrbach along various stretches of its course.

=== Climate ===
Yearly precipitation in Sohren amounts to 764 mm, which falls into the middle third of the precipitation chart for all Germany. At 55% of the German Weather Service's weather stations, lower figures are recorded. The driest month is April. The most rainfall comes in June. In that month, precipitation is 1.4 times what it is in April. Precipitation varies only slightly. At fewer than 1% of the weather stations are lower seasonal swings are recorded.

== History ==
The area around Sohren was settled no later than Celtic and Roman times, as witnessed by many archaeological finds from graves and remnants of Roman farms. In 846, Sohren had its first documentary mention when the Sororo marca was donated to Saint Alban's Abbey in Mainz by Count of the Nahegau Adilbert.

In 1301, the Imperial estate of Sohren, along with the villages of Hahn, Bärenbach, Büchenbeuren, Lautzenhausen, Niedersohren, Niederweiler and Wahlenau, as well as the now vanished villages of Litzelsohren, Vockenrode and Niederhoven, were transferred with King Albrecht I's leave to Count Eberhard of Sponheim-Neef and his wife Elisabeth. This ended the royal estate's history as an autonomous entity.

In 1442, King Friedrich III enfeoffed the Margrave of Baden, Jakob I and the Count of Veldenz as the heirs to the County of Sponheim. After Jakob's death, Emperor Friedrich III enfeoffed his successor, Margrave Karl I and Count Palatine Friedrich of Veldenz with the Sohren landhold.

The alignment of the boundary of the Pflege (literally “care”, but in this context taken to mean “administrative area”) of Sohren was laid out precisely in 1476. This area comprised what are now the municipal areas of Sohren, Niedersohren, Niederweiler, Wahlenau, Büchenbeuren, Lautzenhausen, Bärenbach and Hahn. A 1599 court seal confirms that Sohren had its own court in the 15th century, on which sat a Schultheiß and seven Schöffen (roughly “lay jurists”).

The Sponheimer Hof, the former royal estate of Sohren from Carolingian times, was renovated in 1607. A treaty with regard to the partition of the “Further” County of Sponheim between the Electorate of the Palatinate and Baden was signed in 1707, thereby making the Pflege of Sohren part of the Badish Oberamt of Kirchberg.

Beginning in 1794, Sohren lay under French rule. Under the 1797 Treaty of Campo Formio, the Rhine’s left bank passed to France. Sohren became the centre of a mairie (“mayoralty”) with the villages of Altlay, Bärenbach, Belg, Büchenbeuren, Lautzenhausen, Niedersohren, Niederweiler and Wahlenau with all together 2,407 inhabitants. After French times, the Sohren area passed in 1815 to the Prussian district of Zell. Sohren became the seat of a Bürgermeisterei (“mayoralty”) with 18 villages.

Building work on the Hunsrückquerbahn (railway) running the Simmern-Sohren-Morbach route was completed in 1902. Central water supply was introduced in 1912 and electricity came in 1920.

In 1928, the firm Felke Möbel was founded, which in the 1950s, with 1,500 employees, was one of the region's biggest employers. After the First World War, the village was for a time once again French. Since 1946, it has been part of the then newly founded state of Rhineland-Palatinate. In 1951, work began on NATO’s Hahn Airbase, now Frankfurt-Hahn Airport. Beginning in 1969 there was a Hauptschule, which was later converted into a “regional school” (a type of school in some German states that integrates Hauptschule and Realschule functions). The indoor swimming pool and the sport stadium were opened in 1974. Nine years later, in 1983, the community centre opened.

In 1970, plans to merge the two municipalities of Büchenbeuren and Sohren ended in failure. The hope had been to be able to forestall the breakup of the Verbandsgemeinde of Büchenbeuren. However, when it could be foreseen that nothing could stop this, Sohren fought the proposed merger, which Büchenbeuren council had already approved.

Northeast of the village, near the Birkenhöhe (“Birch Heights”), Sohren's Jewish graveyard can be found. The newest grave dates from 1965. The graveyard was laid out most likely before 1850. The Sohren synagogue was boarded up after Kristallnacht (9–10 November 1938), and then later destroyed by a Nazi Rollkommando.

== Religion ==
The Protestant church is of pre-Reformation origin; the oldest parts go back to the 15th century. Until 1907, it was a simultaneous church, used by both Protestants and Catholics. Not coincidentally, the Catholic Church in Sohren was built in 1907. There is also a congregation of the Evangelical Free Church in Sohren, called the Philadelphiagemeinde. The congregational facilities are on Laufersweiler Straße on the way out of the village.

== Politics ==
=== Municipal council ===
The council is made up of 20 council members, who were elected by proportional representation at the municipal election held on 7 June 2009, and the honorary mayor as chairman.

The municipal election held on 7 June 2009 yielded the following results:

	SPD	CDU	WG Wüllenweber	other	Total
2009	7	8	5	-	20 seats
2004	7	6	-	7	20 seats

=== Mayor ===
Sohren's mayor is Markus Bongard (CDU), and his deputies are Holger Michel (FWG), Gerd Endres (CDU) and Manfred Ussat (SPD). Mr. Michel, however, although a deputy, is not a member of the municipal council.

=== Coat of arms ===
The German blazon reads: In Schwarz ein von Blau und Gold in zwei Reihen geschachter Balken; darüber schwebend eine goldene Blätterkrone mit blauen und roten Besatzsteinen.

The municipality's arms might in English heraldic language be described thus: Sable a fess abased countercompony azure and Or, above which a crown Or set with stones of the first and gules.

The arms are based on the court seal known to have been used in 1599 and later by the Pflege of Sohren. The seal's composition showed a chequered fess (horizontal stripe) with a crown above it. The circumscription reads DES. GERICHTS. SORN. (“of the court of Sohren”).

=== Town partnerships ===
Sohren fosters partnerships with the following places:

- Middelkerke-Slijpe, West Flanders, Belgium since 1969

== Culture and sightseeing ==
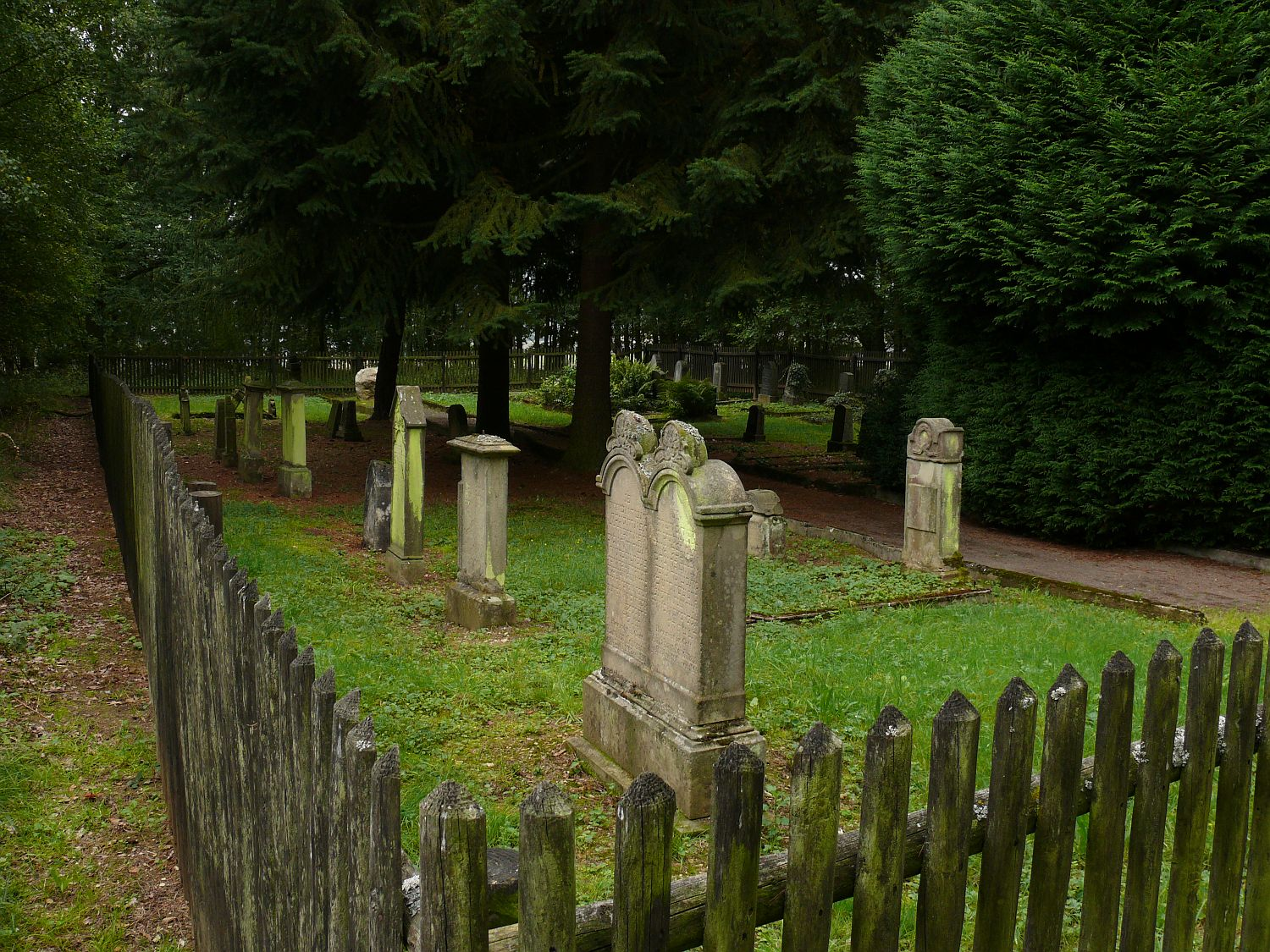
Jewish graveyard

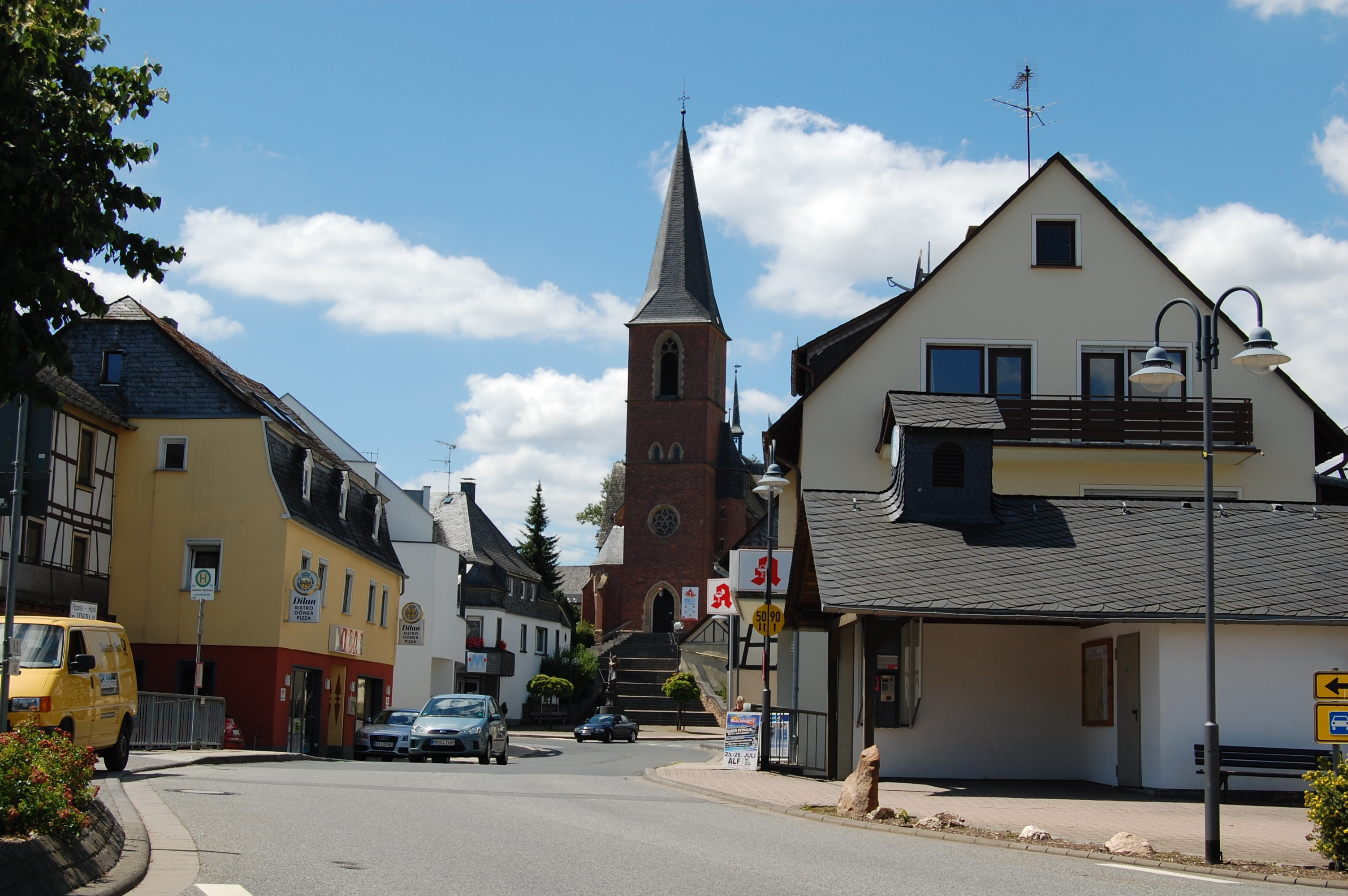
Pfarrstraße: Saint Michael's Catholic Parish Church

=== Buildings ===
The following are listed buildings or sites in Rhineland-Palatinate’s Directory of Cultural Monuments:

- Protestant church, Kirchstraße – Baroque aisleless church, 1761/1762
- Saint Michael’s Roman-Catholic Parish Church (Pfarrkirche St. Michael), Pfarrstraße – Gothic Revival brick building, 1907, architect Eduard Endler, Cologne
- Bahnhofstraße 1 – former Hunsrückbahn railway station; many-winged building with half-hipped roof, partly quarrystone, plastered or slated, about 1907; goods loading station, timber-frame
- Hauptstraße/corner of Denkmalstraße – warriors’ memorial; sandstone sculpture under octagonal structure; whole complex of buildings
- Beside Turmstraße 2a – Hunsrückbahn watertower, about 1909
- Jewish graveyard (monumental zone) – founded before 1850 (?), 47 gravestones

== Economy and infrastructure ==
=== Transport ===
The village lies roughly 2 km (1 mi) by road from Rhineland-Palatinate's only international airport, Frankfurt-Hahn Airport. Sohren can be reached from the east over the Autobahn A 61 and Bundesstraße 50, and from the west over the Hunsrückhöhenstraße (“Hunsrück Heights Road”, a scenic road across the Hunsrück built originally as a military road on Hermann Göring’s orders), also called Bundesstraße 327.

=== Education ===
Sohren has two schools, a primary school with about 400 pupils and a “regional school”, This Regionale Schule Sohren-Büchenbeuren has a branch location in Rhaunen (Birkenfeld district).

== Famous people ==
- Aloys Felke
- Günter Felke
- Michael Felke
