= Zinc-lead deposits in Wiesloch =

Mines in Wiesloch
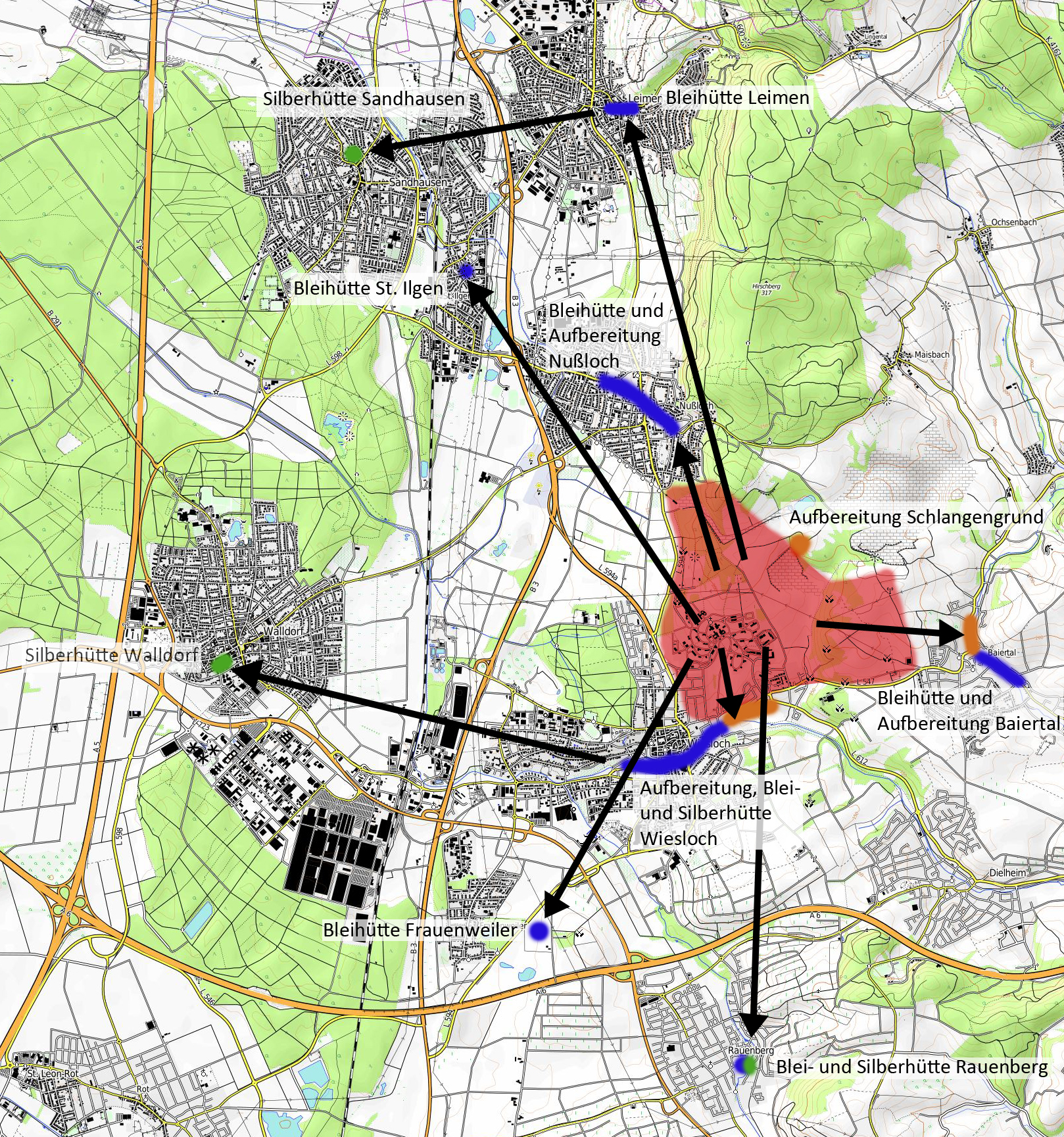
- Mines and processing in the area

- Location within Germany
- Location: Wiesloch, Baden-Württemberg, Germany; 49.3°N 8.72°E
- Products: Zinc (Zn); Lead (Pb); Silver (Ag)
- Type: Underground; Mississippi Valley-Type (MVT)
- Closed: 1953
- Company: Stolberger Zink

The area around Wiesloch, Germany, is a historical centre for mining, running between Roman times and the early 2000s. The area is situated on the eastern edge of the Upper Rhine Plain and contains large concentrations of carbonate-hosted lead-zinc ore deposits. Lime (Kalk) for cement is still actively mined in the vicinity, with most of the clay pits closed, and the last heavy metal mine operated until 1953 by Stolberger Zink. On top of the escarpment metals and lime have been mined, with clay and sand mined at the end of the valley floor where faulting has brought different layers closer to the surface.

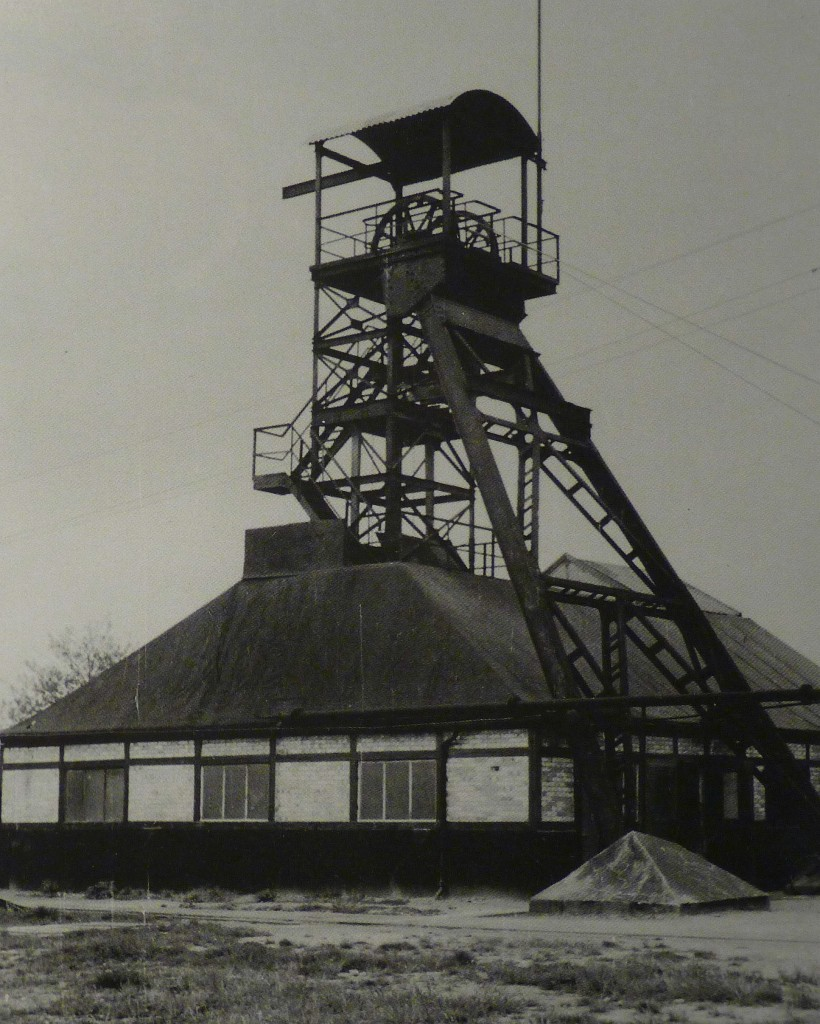
Schafbuckel shaft, closed in 1953

During the 11th century, around ~100 tonnes of silver are estimated to have been mined, contributing financially to the area and liking funding the creation of Speyer Cathedral.

Along the length of the River Leimbach are spoil tips from historic mining.

The Nussloch quarry extracting lime for cement and belonging to HeidelbergCement was anticipated to reach permitted limits for extraction during the late-2020s.

== Overview ==
The main mines in the vicinity of Wiesloch were:

- Nussloch quarry, lime, transported by the Nußloch–Leimen ropeway for processing by HeidelbergCement in Leimen
- Gottes Segen, zinc-silver deep mines, processed by Stolberger Zink on the surface at the Schafbuckel in Altwiesloch
- Hesseler quarry, processed at the Hessler Kalkwerke in Altwiesloch
- Dämmelwald clay pit, processed by Tonwaren-Industrie Wiesloch near Wiesloch-Walldorf station. Closed in 1988
- Nussloch clay pit, processed by Stauch at Nussloch
- Frauenweiler sand pit
- Frauenweiler clay pits, ×3, processed at Bott/Trost at Rauenberg
- Malsch clay pit, processed at Malsch
