= Felke Möbelwerke =

German furniture factory

FELKE Möbelwerke GmbH & Co.KG
- Founded: 1928 in Sohren, Germany
- Founder: Michael Felke
- Defunct: 2003
- Headquarters: Sohren
- Products: furniture
- Revenue: 200 million DM
- Number of employees: 1,500 (1950th-1970th)
- Website: http://www.felke-gewerbepark.de/

The Felke-Möbelwerke company was a German furniture factory with its headquarters in Sohren in the Hunsrück region and branches all over the country. It was one of the largest employers in the Hunsrück and significantly increased the economic importance of the region.

== History ==
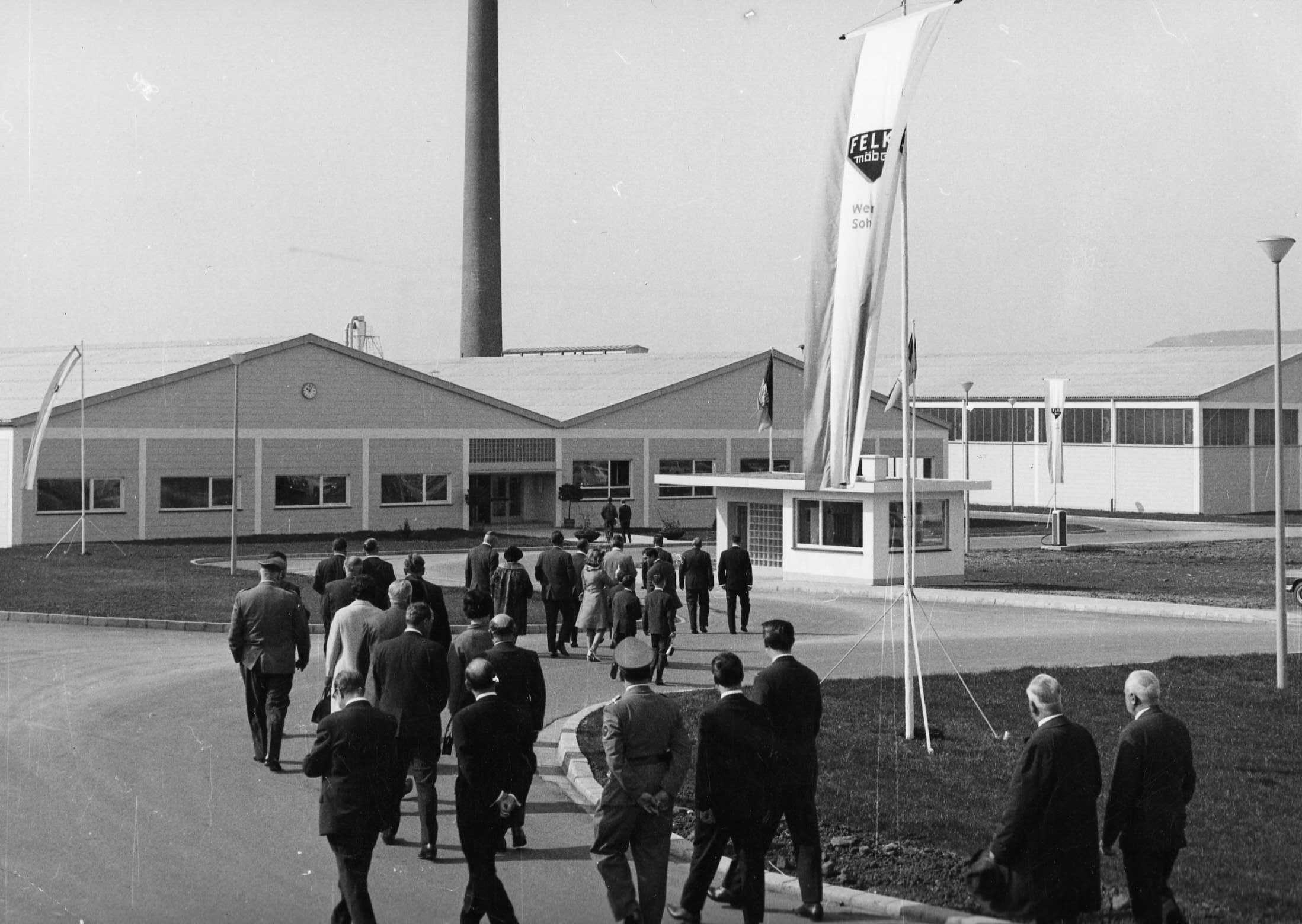
FELKE producing plant 1965

The Felke-Möbelwerke GmbH & Co.KG was founded by Michael Felke in Sohren in 1928 and emerged from his first furniture factory that had been established in Laufersweiler in 1919.

In the 1950s the Felke-Möbelwerke became one of the biggest furniture factories in Southern Germany with three production plants in Sohren, Simmern and Hermeskeil and it boosted the industrial development in the Hunsrück region.

The factories mainly produced for Central and Western Europe.

At the end of the 1960s the founder Michael Felke gradually handed over executive power to his sons Aloys, Walter and Günter Felke.

Since the early 1970s affiliated companies were set up in order to also supply the wholesale market in Germany.

After the German reunification in 1990 Felke-Möbelwerke had to reduce its production step by step due to import dumping from Eastern European countries.

The last active production plant shut down in 2003.

Since 2001 the succeeding company Felke-Gewerbepark has been managing the former production sites (170.000 sqm) and property (400.000 sqm) of Felke-Möbelwerke all over Germany.

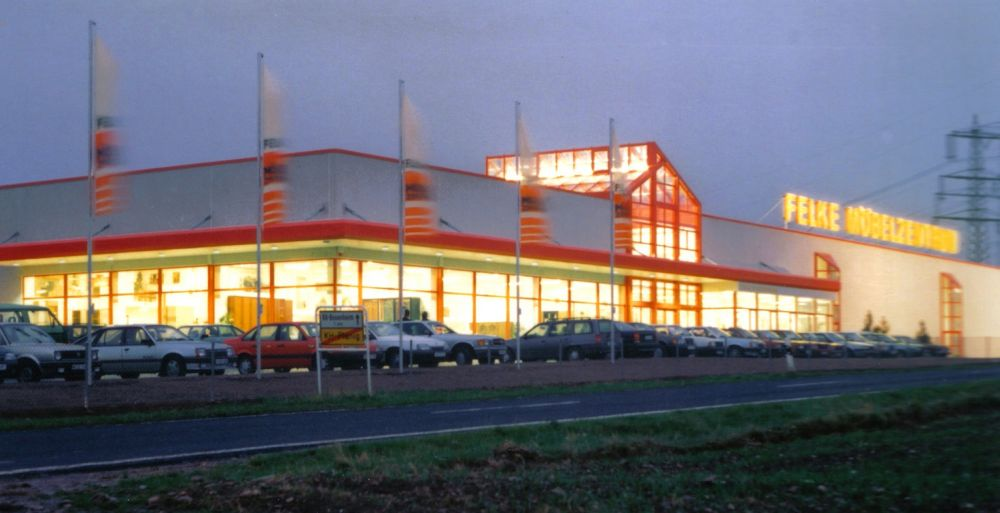
FELKE Furniture Center 1989
