= Laufersweiler =

- Municipality
- Coat of arms

- Location of Laufersweiler within Rhein-Hunsrück-Kreis district
- Interactive map of Laufersweiler
- Location within Germany Location within Rhineland-Palatinate
- Coordinates: 49°53′48″N 7°18′18″E
- Country: Germany
- State: Rhineland-Palatinate
- District: Rhein-Hunsrück-Kreis
- Municipal assoc.: Kirchberg

Government
  - Mayor (2019–24): Rudi Schneider

Area
  - Total: 6.79 km^{2} (2.62 sq mi)
- Elevation: 425 m (1,394 ft)

Population (2025-12-31)
  - Total: 796
  - Density: 117/km^{2} (304/sq mi)
- Time zone: UTC+01:00 (CET)
  - Summer (DST): UTC+02:00 (CEST)
- Postal codes: 55487
- Dialling codes: 06543
- Vehicle registration: SIM

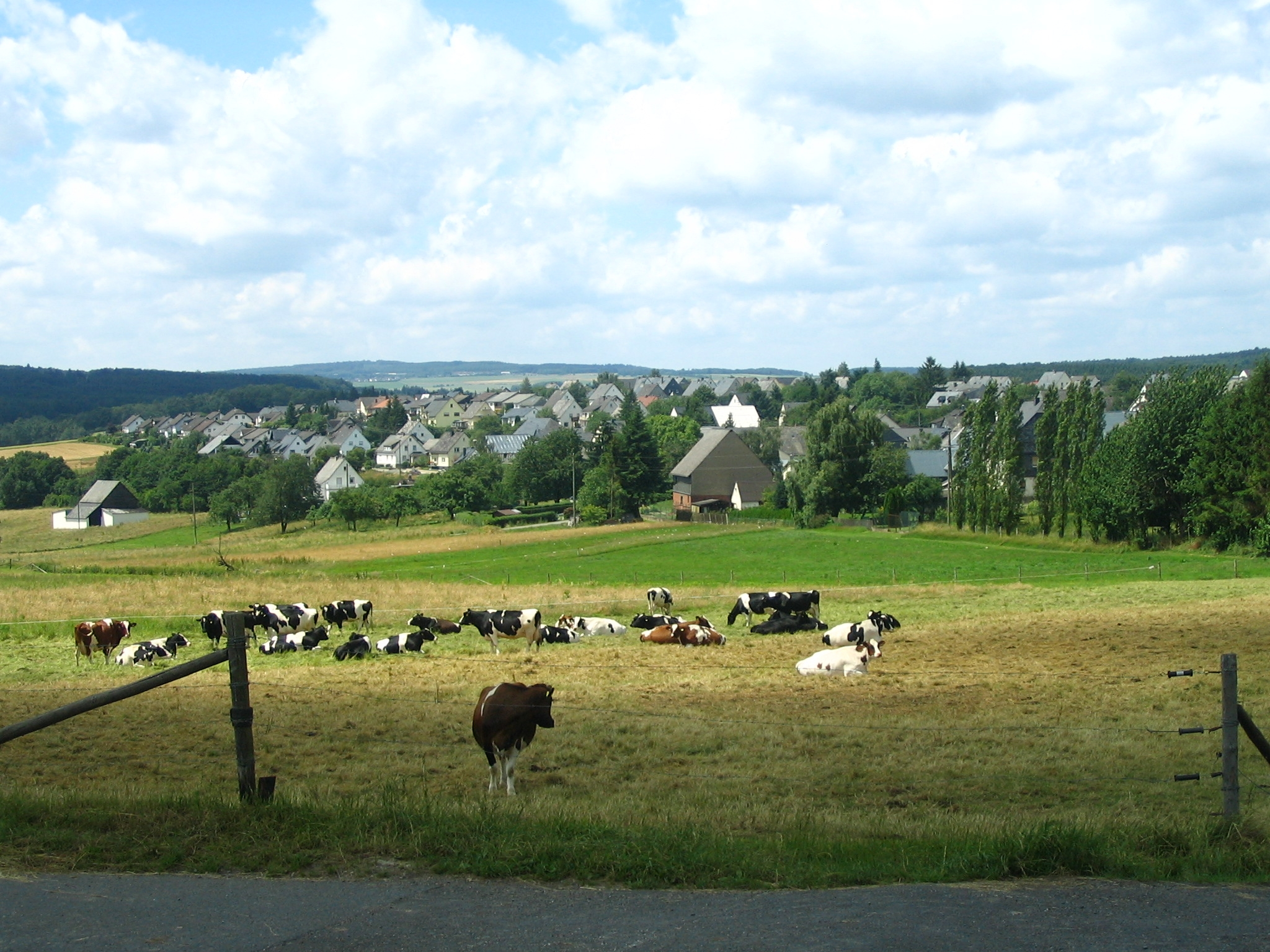
View of the village from the southeast

Laufersweiler is an Ortsgemeinde – a municipality belonging to a Verbandsgemeinde, a kind of collective municipality – in the Rhein-Hunsrück-Kreis (district) in Rhineland-Palatinate, Germany. It belongs to the Verbandsgemeinde of Kirchberg, whose seat is in the like-named town.

== Geography ==
=== Location ===
The municipality lies in the Hunsrück roughly 8 km southwest of Kirchberg and 16 km southwest of Simmern.

== History ==
=== Prehistory and antiquity ===
Going by archaeological finds from prehistory and protohistory, the Laufersweiler area might have been settled as early as the Bronze Age and Hallstatt times. Along what is now the municipal limit between Laufersweiler and Niederweiler ran the Via Ausonia (or Ausoniusstraße in German) in Roman times. This led from Trier to Bingen am Rhein. Archaeological finds bear witness to a settlement in Roman times.

=== Middle Ages ===
In 1283, Laufersweiler had its first documentary mention as Leuferswilre, and was owned by the Waldgraves. In the 14th century, the ownership arrangements changed in such a way that part of the village became an Electoral-Trier fief and another became subject to the Barons of Schmidtburg. Beginning in the Late Middle Ages, Laufersweiler belonged to the High Court of Rhaunen. In 1563, Laufersweiler had 34 or 35 households that were subject to various lords.

=== Ecclesiastical history ===
The first documentary mention of any church building in Laufersweiler comes from 1405 and tells of a chapel consecrated to Mary. It is unknown, however, when Saint Lawrence's Church, which burnt down in 1839, was built. This church was subject first to the parish of Hausen. After the Reformation had been lastingly established in the 1560s by the Wild- and Rhinegraves, Laufersweiler became an autonomous Evangelical parish by 1602. The first rectory was built in 1617. Already by about 1645, towards the end of the Thirty Years' War, the Hunsrück was occupied for the first time by the French, as it later was once again in King Louis XIV's wars of conquest. About 1685, on French demands, Saint Lawrence's Church (Kirche St. Laurentius) was made a simultaneous church in which both Evangelical and Catholic services were to be held.

=== Coaching inn ===
Beginning in the mid 16th century, there was in Laufersweiler a coaching inn (Poststation) on the Dutch Postal Route (Niederländischer Postkurs) from Brussels to Augsburg, Innsbruck, Trento, Venice, Milan and Rome. This postal way station was first mentioned in the documents about the 1561 mail robbery, when the horse-borne post was attacked on the way from Laufersweiler to Eckweiler (now a ghost village). According to these documents, in 1561, a man named Hans from Wittlich was the innkeeper. His successor in the late 16th century was Niclas Faust, who founded a “dynasty of innkeepers”. The inn lasted even through the 18th century. In 1867, Laufersweiler lay on a newly established postal route from Kirn to Büchenbeuren. In 1886, the inn was reorganized as a Deutsche Reichspost postal agency (Postagentur; run not by the postal service, but by a private agent). This lasted until 1994.

=== After the French Revolution ===
After the French Revolution, the Rhine’s left bank, and thereby Laufersweiler too, were ceded to France in 1794. In 1815 Laufersweiler was assigned to the Kingdom of Prussia at the Congress of Vienna. After the great fire of 1839, which also destroyed the church, a new simultaneous church was built in 1842. Only in 1892 and 1893 did the Evangelicals finally have their own church, built in Romanesque Revival style.

By the 18th century, Laufersweiler had a Jewish community. The first synagogue was built before 1832. The one built in 1910 and 1911 was extensively vandalized by Nazi hooligans on Kristallnacht (9–10 November 1938). In the years that followed, 24 Jewish inhabitants fell victim to the Holocaust. In 1986, the synagogue was restored.

Since 1946, Laufersweiler has been part of the then newly founded state of Rhineland-Palatinate. Since administrative reform in 1970, Laufersweiler has belonged to the Verbandsgemeinde of Kirchberg.

== Politics ==
=== Municipal council ===
The council is made up of 12 council members, who were elected by proportional representation at the municipal election held on 7 June 2009, and the honorary mayor as chairman.

The municipal election held on 7 June 2009 yielded the following results:

	SPD	WG Schneider	FWG Laufersweiler	Total
2009	3	5	4	12 seats

=== Mayor ===
Laufersweiler's mayor is Rudi Schneider.

=== Coat of arms ===
The German blazon reads: In geteiltem Schild oben in Silber ein rotes Balkenkreuz, unten in Schwarz eine silberne Schnalle.

The municipality's arms might in English heraldic language be described thus: Per fess argent a cross gules and sable an arming buckle of the first.

The Cross of Trier in the upper part of the escutcheon recalls Laufersweiler's former allegiance to the Electorate of Trier, which bore this device in its arms. Likewise, the charge below this, the buckle, refers to a former lord, the Schenk of Schmidtburg, whose arms bore this device.

== Culture and sightseeing ==
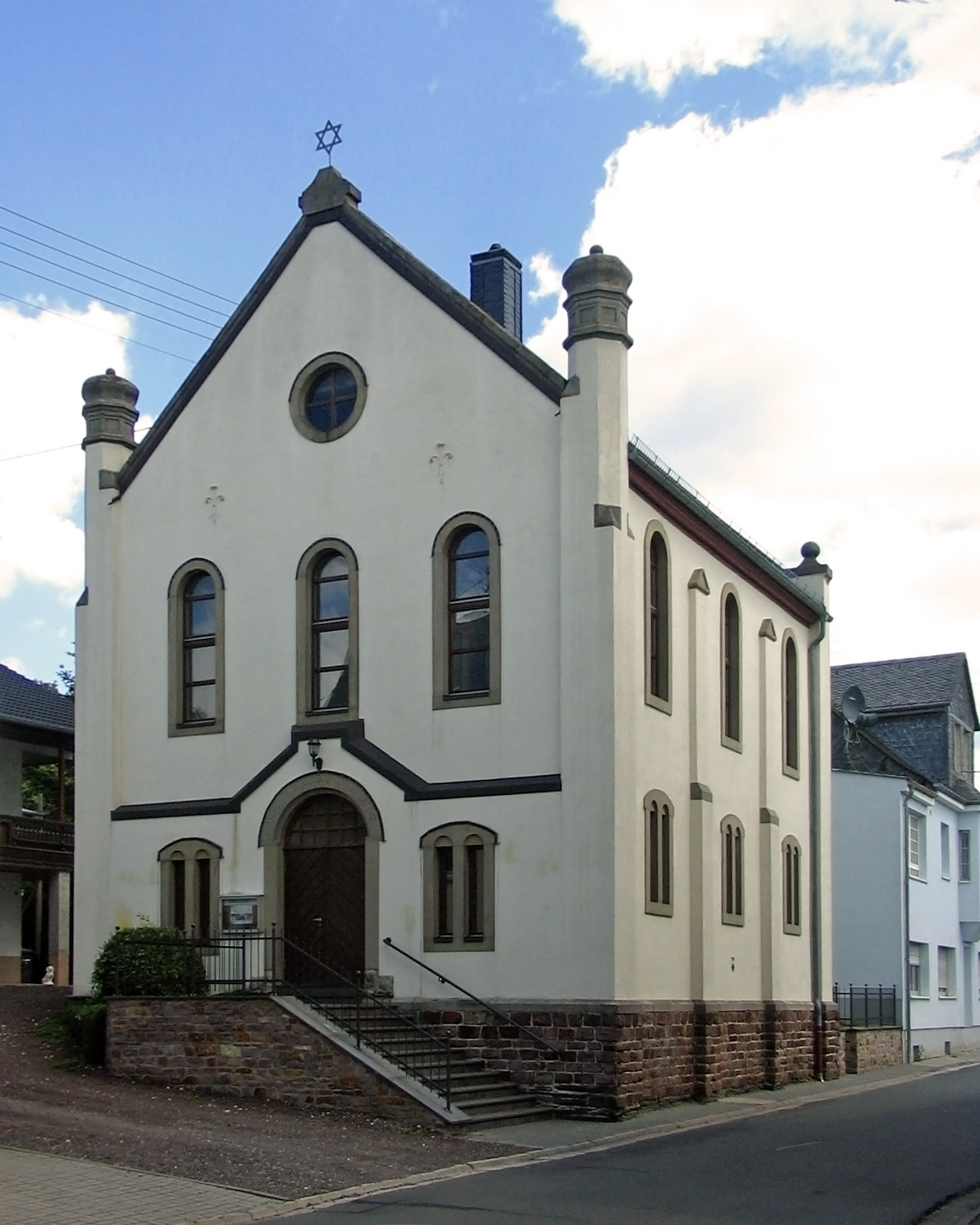
Renovated synagogue

=== Buildings ===
The following are listed buildings or sites in Rhineland-Palatinate’s Directory of Cultural Monuments:

- Evangelical church, Kirchgasse 7 – Romanesque Revival slate quarrystone aisleless church, 1892/1893
- Saint Lawrence's Catholic Church (Kirche St. Laurentius), Die Fahrt 1 – Romanesque Revival aisleless church, 1842
- Auf der Linde 1 – community centre and bakehouse; one-floor timber-frame building, partly slated, 18th century
- Burenbach 14 – bakehouse; one-floor plastered building, 19th century
- Kirchgasse 6 – former synagogue, Putzbau, 1911 (see also below)
- Unterdorf 3/5 – former Thurn und Taxis coaching inn; timber-frame building, partly solid or slated, mansard roof, marked 1786
- Unterdorf 11 – timber-frame Quereinhaus (a combination residential and commercial house divided for these two purposes down the middle, perpendicularly to the street), partly solid, 19th century
- Jewish graveyard, on village's northwest outskirts (monumental zone) – 58 gravestones, 19th and 20th centuries

=== More about buildings ===
Housed in the former synagogue is a museum of Jewish history in the Hunsrück. A document collection, which forms part of the permanent exhibit, can be viewed here.

In the Lower Village (Unterdorf) and on Kirchgasse are found timber-frame buildings with carved doors that are worth seeing.

The former town hall comes from the 17th century. Particularly worthy of mention here is the jetty on the upper floor with the former quarters for vagabonds.

=== Clubs ===
Laufersweiler has several clubs:

- Theaterfreunde Laufersweiler (theatre)
- SG Gösenroth - Laufersweiler (team handball)
- Akkordeonorchester & Musikfreunde Hunsrück (accordion and music)
- Heimat- und Wanderverein (heritage and hiking)
- TV 1911 Laufersweiler (gymnastic club)
- Gemischter Chor Frohsinn (mixed choir)

== Famous people ==
=== Sons and daughters of the town ===
- Aloys Felke
- Günter Felke
- Michael Felke
