= Büchenbeuren =

- Municipality
- Coat of arms

- Location of Büchenbeuren within Rhein-Hunsrück-Kreis district
- Interactive map of Büchenbeuren
- Location within Germany Location within Rhineland-Palatinate
- Coordinates: 49°55′16.61″N 7°16′47.36″E
- Country: Germany
- State: Rhineland-Palatinate
- District: Rhein-Hunsrück-Kreis
- Municipal assoc.: Kirchberg

Government
  - Mayor (2019–24): Guido Scherer

Area
  - Total: 6 km^{2} (2.3 sq mi)
- Elevation: 460 m (1,510 ft)

Population (2025-12-31)
  - Total: 1,828
  - Density: 300/km^{2} (790/sq mi)
- Time zone: UTC+01:00 (CET)
  - Summer (DST): UTC+02:00 (CEST)
- Postal codes: 55491
- Dialling codes: 06543
- Vehicle registration: SIM
- Website: www.buechenbeuren.de

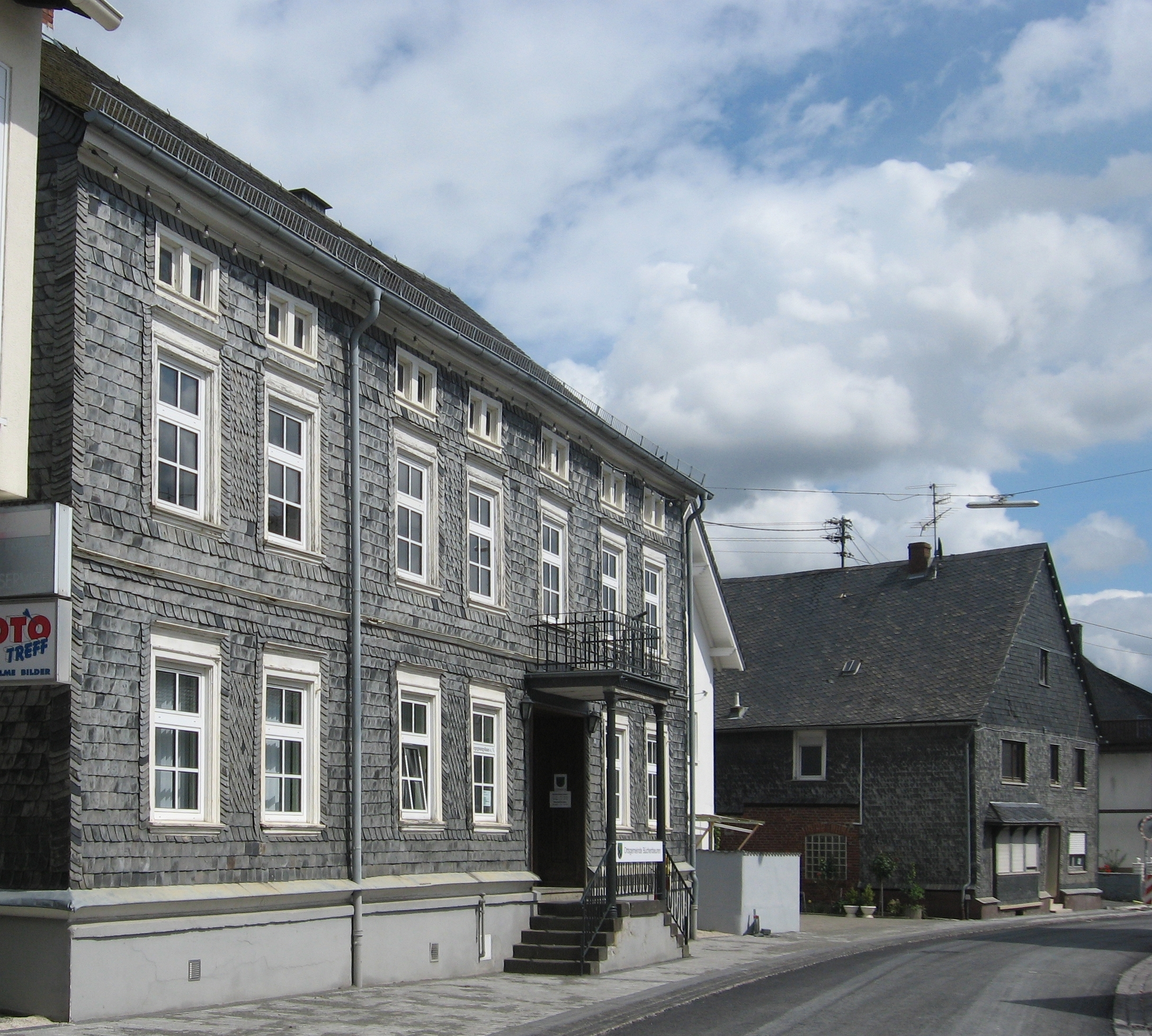
The “Altes Amt”, seat of the municipal administration

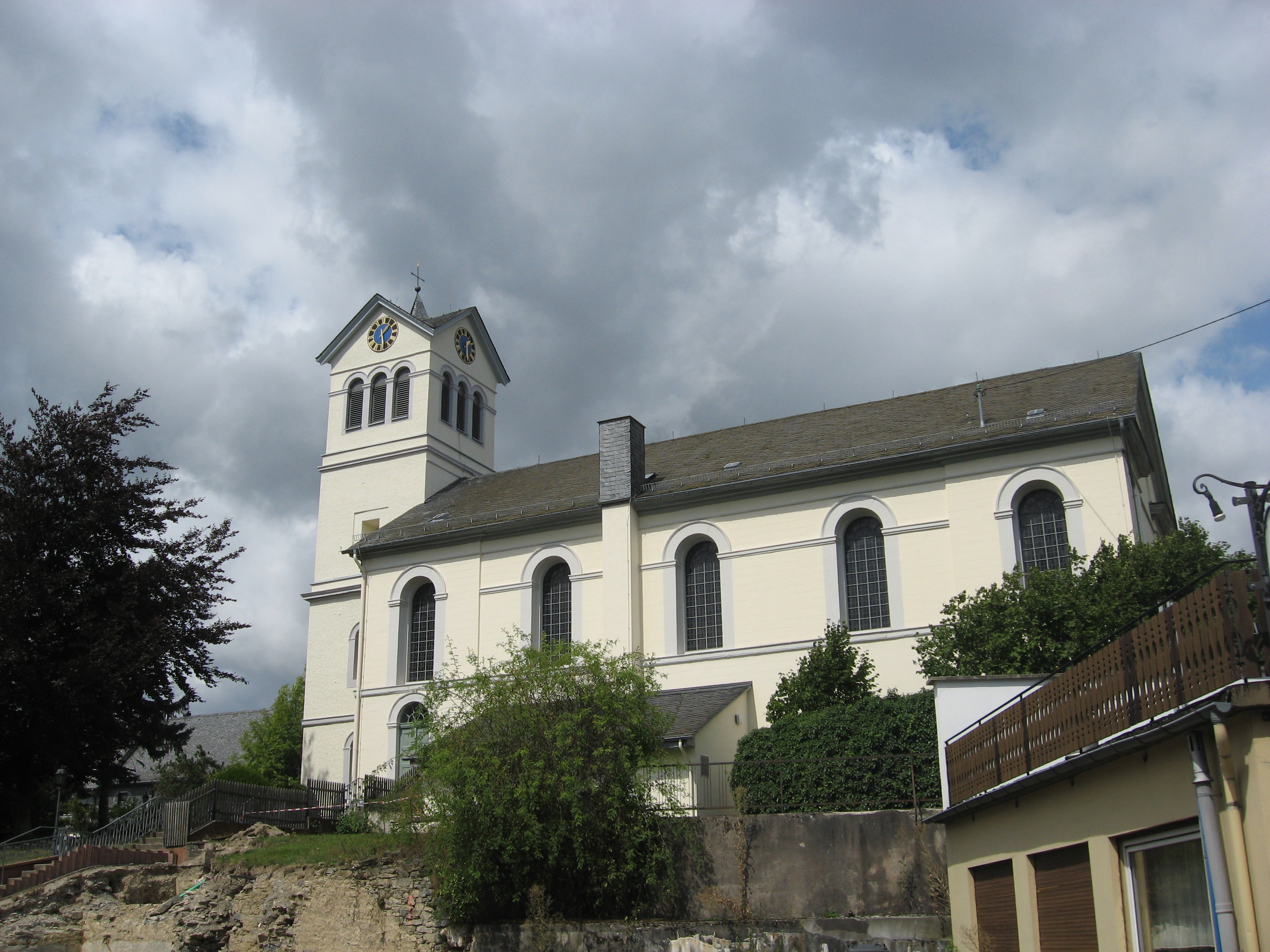
Evangelical church

Büchenbeuren (German pronunciation: [byːçn̩ˈbɔʏʁən]) is an Ortsgemeinde – a municipality belonging to a Verbandsgemeinde, a kind of collective municipality – in the Rhein-Hunsrück-Kreis (district) in Rhineland-Palatinate, Germany. It belongs to the Verbandsgemeinde of Kirchberg, whose seat is in the like-named town. Büchenbeuren is a state-recognized tourism municipality (Fremdenverkehrsort), and according to state planning, is laid out as a lower centre.

== Geography ==
=== Location ===
The municipality lies in the central Hunsrück northeast of the Idarwald (forest).

=== Constituent communities ===
Büchenbeuren is divided among the outlying Ortsteil of Scheid, part of Frankfurt-Hahn Airport and the main centre, also called Büchenbeuren.

== History ==
In 1301, Büchenbeuren had its first documentary mention in a document from the comital family Sponheim. Nevertheless, it is believed to be roughly 300 years older than that. Büchenbeuren belonged until the end of the Middle Ages to the landholdings under the lordship of the Counts of Sponheim. In 1437, the village passed to the Margraves of Baden and the Counts Palatine of the Rhine.

In the late 18th century, modernity was slow in coming to Büchenbeuren. In 1783, serfdom was abolished by Margrave Karl Friedrich.

In October 1794, French troops occupied Büchenbeuren. The rectory served as a French military hospital. Beginning in 1796, Büchenbeuren, like all lands on the Rhine’s left bank, belonged directly to France, although French administration here only became fully functional in 1798. Büchenbeuren belonged to the newly formed Arrondissement of Simmern in the Department of Rhin-et-Moselle with Simmern as the administrative seat. Kirchberg became the seat of a canton, and Büchenbeuren belonged, along with Altlay, Bärenbach, Belg, Lautzenhausen, Niederweiler and Wahlenau to the Mairie (“Mayoralty”) of Sohren. In 1804, the French introduced the Code civil des Français.

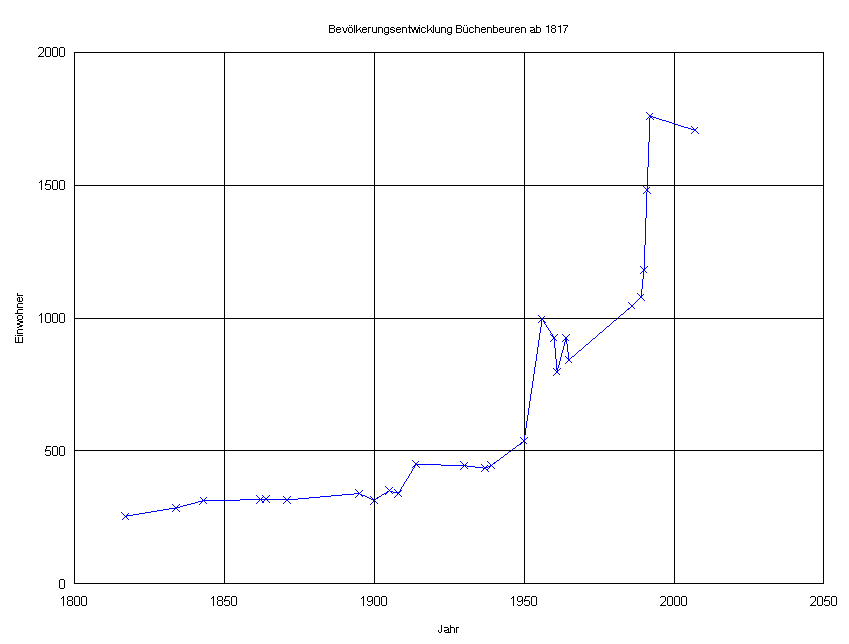
Population development in Büchenbeuren

In 1814, French rule in the Hunsrück ended, and Büchenbeuren, along with the rest of the Hunsrück was made part of the Zentralverwaltungsdepartement (“Central Administration Department”) of Mittelrhein on 2 February 1814, and then on 16 June of that same year, part of the Zentralverwaltungsdepartement of Nieder- und Mittelrhein under Johann August Sack, a high Prussian official. At the Congress of Vienna, the Hunsrück was made part of the Grand Duchy of the Lower Rhine, a Prussian province, which in 1822 was merged with the Province of Jülich-Cleves-Berg to form the Rhine Province. Nevertheless, until 1845, Büchenbeuren was still administered under the French municipal constitution. Only in the mid 19th century was the Gemeinde-Ordnung für den Preußischen Staat (“Municipal Order for the Prussian State”) introduced.

In 1882, the first telegraph lines reached Büchenbeuren, with telephone coming two years later. Work on the railway, the Hunsrückquerbahn, began in March 1900, with mostly Italian building crews, and on 6 December 1902, service began.

In the First World War, 63 men from Büchenbeuren (out of a total population then of 450) took part. Twelve never came back. Six others ended up in prisoner-of-war camps and four others were wounded. A war memorial was built outside the church in 1926. By 1919, Büchenbeuren was occupied by the war’s victors. At Christmas that same year, electric light shone for the first time in the village. The occupation ended in 1930. On 7 March 1936, after the Nazis had seized power on 30 January 1933, German troops occupied the Rhineland.

In 1938, on Hermann Göring’s orders, work began on the Hunsrückhöhenstraße (“Hunsrück Highway”).

In the Second World War, there was an air raid on 19 August 1944 by the USAAF. On 17 and 18 March 1945, American troops marched in. Later the same year, the French became the new occupiers.

In 1951, Hahn Air Base was built, along with the base housing development (known locally as “Housing”), in the outlying centre of Scheid. A fighter-bomber unit was stationed there the following year, and the year after that, yet another housing development was built, this one for German airbase employees.

In 1967 began the partnership with Schore, Belgium, now a constituent community of Middelkerke (see below).

On 30 September 1991, the 50th Tactical Fighter Wing left Hahn Air Base. The Americans withdrew completely from the base on 12 August 1993.

On 25 February 1994, Büchenbeuren’s population had reached 2,000. In 2001, the municipality celebrated its 700th anniversary of first documentary mention.

== Politics ==
=== Municipal council ===
The council is made up of 16 council members, who were elected by proportional representation at the municipal election held on 7 June 2009, and the honorary mayor as chairman.

The municipal election held on 7 June 2009 yielded the following results:

	SPD	FDP	FWG Büchenbeuren	All voter groups (sum)	Total
2009	6	5	5	–	16 seats
2004	6	5	–	3	16 seats

=== Mayor ===
Büchenbeuren’s mayor is Guido Scherer.

=== Coat of arms ===
The municipality’s arms might be described thus: Per bend chequy of twenty Or and azure and vert a beech sprig leafed of two and slipped in bend of the first.

=== Town partnerships ===
Büchenbeuren fosters partnerships with the following places:

- Middelkerke-Schore, West Flanders, Belgium since 1967

== Culture and sightseeing ==
=== Buildings ===
The following are listed buildings or sites in Rhineland-Palatinate’s Directory of Cultural Monuments:

- Evangelical church, Hauptstraße: Classicist aisleless church, 1838-1840, building inspector Ludwig Behr, Kreuznach
- Bahnhofstraße 11: Late Historicist villa, Renaissance Revival, about 1900; whole complex of buildings with garden

== Economy and infrastructure ==
=== Transport ===
The village lies some two kilometres by road from Rhineland-Palatinate’s only international airport, Frankfurt-Hahn Airport. Büchenbeuren can be reached from the east over the Autobahn A 61 and Bundesstraße 50, and from the west over the Hunsrückhöhenstraße (“Hunsrück Heights Road”, a scenic road across the Hunsrück built originally as a military road on Hermann Göring’s orders; also called Bundesstraße 327).

Moreover, the old Hunsrückquerbahn (railway) runs through the municipality, although this is now largely abandoned.

From Büchenbeuren, buses run to Frankfurt-Hahn Airport, Idar-Oberstein, Kirn, Bingen am Rhein and Simmern.

=== Economy ===
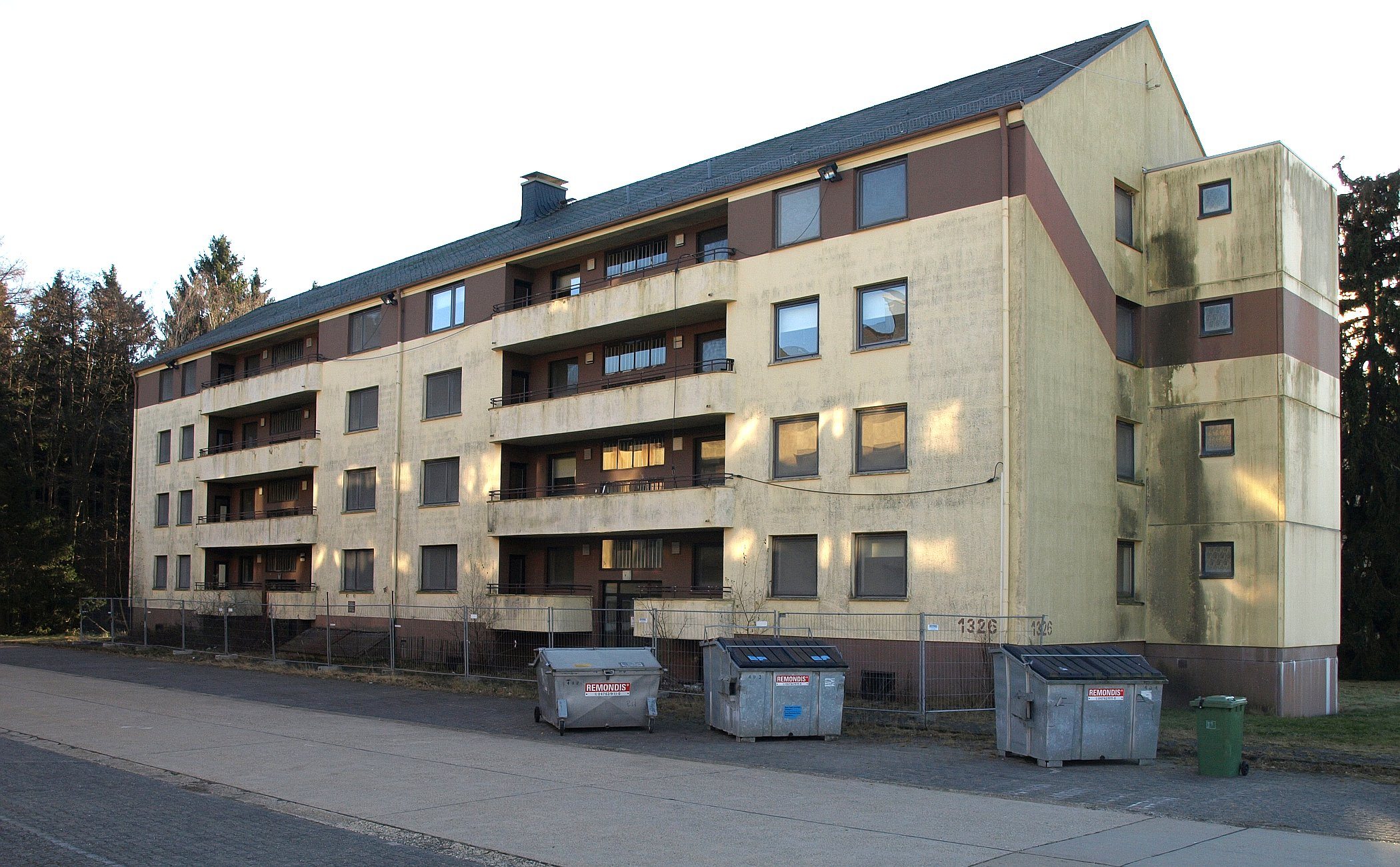
“Family Housing”, the former Hahn Air Base housing for US personnel

The outlying centre of Scheid has been since 1996 home to the Landespolizeischule Rheinland-Pfalz (“Rhineland-Palatinate State Police College”). This stands on what once was the Hahn Air Base housing area for US personnel. Many of the now unused buildings there have fallen into disrepair.

=== Education ===
In Büchenbeuren are found one primary school and one kindergarten.

=== Fire brigade ===
Büchenbeuren has a firefighting post that together with the one in nearby Sohren forms the local fire brigade. Each year, the brigade responds to roughly 100 calls within its area of responsibility. It has eight vehicles, among which are specialized vehicles such as an aerial ladder truck, a truck for dealing with hazardous goods and a hose truck with one thousand metres of hose.
