= Michael Felke =

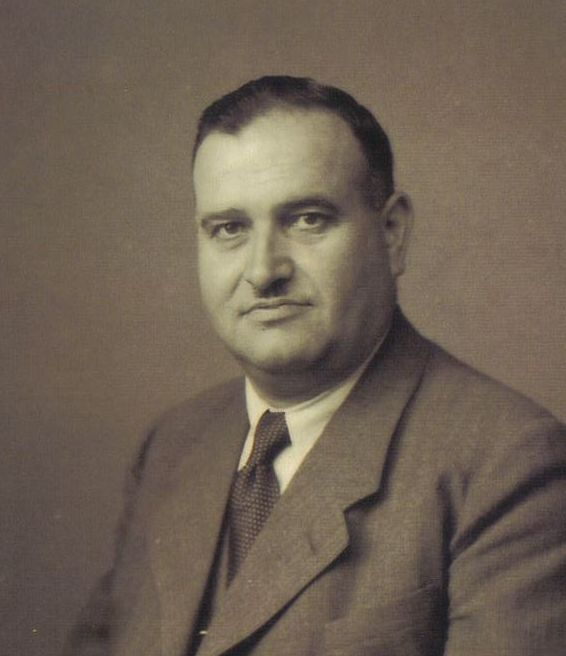
Michael Felke.

Michael Felke (18 April 1895 in Laufersweiler – 8 April 1977 in Sohren) was a German furniture manufacturer.

== Life ==
Michael Felke was the first of four children and came from a poor family background. He learned the job of a joiner in his father’s small carpenter's workshop in Laufersweiler (State of Rhineland-Palatinate). Michael Felke inherited his father’s carpenter's workshop in 1919 after World War I. He then moved the workshop to Sohren in 1928 and started expanding - the beginning of the company Felke-Möbelwerke GmbH & Co.KG.

Due to his dedication he was known as an industrial pioneer in the Hunsrück region. He managed to boost the region’s industry and created many jobs.

Michael Felke was married to Maria Felke and the father of 3 sons. Among his sons were Aloys Felke, manufacturer and politician, and Günter Felke, manufacturer, numismatist and patron.

== Distinctions ==
In 1957 Pope Pius XII decorated Michael Felke with the „Pro Ecclesia et Pontifice“ award for his social commitment. His home town Sohren nominated Felke honorary citizen. In 1965 he was awarded the German Federal Cross of Merit, First class.
