= Günter Felke =

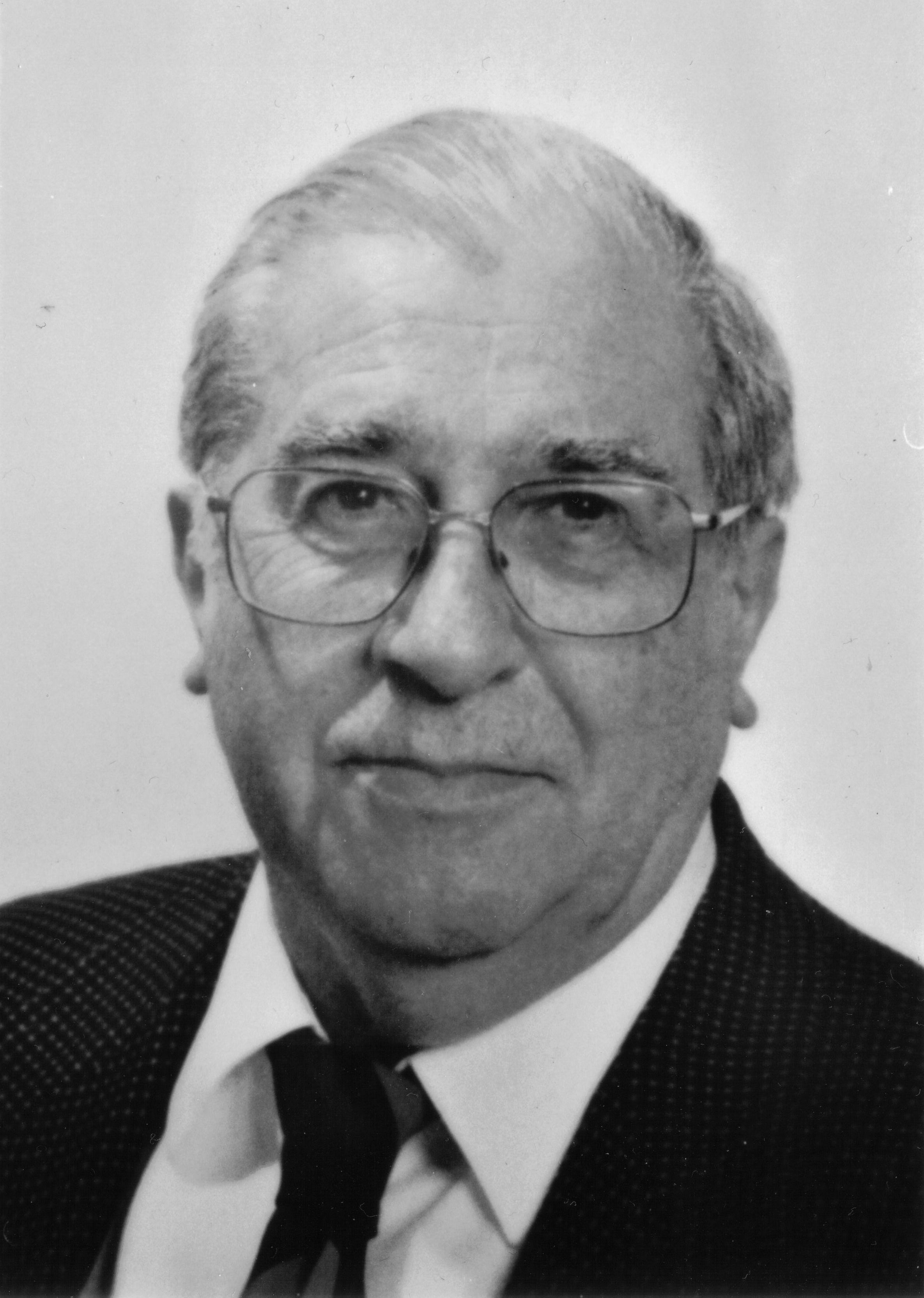
Günter Felke.

Günter Felke (4 November 1929 in Laufersweiler – 22 March 2005 in Sohren) was a German furniture manufacturer, numismatist and patron of culture.

== Life ==
Günter Felke was born as the youngest son of the industrialist Michael Felke and his wife Maria in Laufersweiler (State of Rhineland-Palatinate). In 1929 his family moved to Sohren, a village nearby, where his father expanded his furniture factory, the company Felke Möbelwerke. He studied at the Herzog-Johann-Gymnasium in Simmern, which he left in 1948 prior to the final exams to work for his father's company. With his two brothers Aloys and Walter Felke he worked as a junior boss alongside his father. In 1970 he became chief operating officer and technical director.

In 1960 Günter Felke discovered his fascination with the history of numismatics in Palatinate (Pfalz) and Mainz. As a collector of Roman, medieval and modern gold coins from the Rhineland, he presented a large collection of rare exhibits to museums in Veldenz, Simmern and Heidelberg. He also wrote several essays on coining in Veldenz.

In 1980 Felke became a member of the Bavarian Numismatic Society (Bayerische Numismatische Gesellschaft). One year later he published his first book about the history of native gold stamping Die Münzen der Herzöge von Simmern. That book was soon followed by the illustrated book Die Goldprägungen der Rheinischen Kurfürsten 1346-1478 in 1989. 1984 he was one of the founders of the Pfälzische Numismatische Gesellschaft.

In the following years Günter Felke subsequently increased his efforts in the cultural sector and the education for young students. His foundation has been presenting the Günter-Felke-Award to outstanding students at the Herzog-Johann-Gymnasium in Simmern since 1990.

Günter Felke was married and the father of three children.

== Günter-Felke-Foundation ==
The Günter Felke Foundation (Günter-Felke-Stiftung) was founded by Günter Felke in October 1989. The foundation has been awarding annual prizes at the Herzog-Johann-Gymnasium since 1990 to students with outstanding achievements. Since 1990 the Günter-Felke-Foundation has awarded 305 prizes and a total sum of approximately 100.000 Euros to 1317 students (as of 2009). The award is largely funded by the benefits of Felke's last book.

== Distinctions ==
- 1994 – Honorary Award of Simmern
- 2000 – Honorary citizen of Simmern
- 2001 – Order of Merit of Rhineland-Palatinate

== Publications ==
- Die Münzen der Herzöge von Simmern, 1981.
- Die Goldprägungen der rheinischen Kurfürsten 1346–1478. Mainz, Trier, Köln, Pfalz. Münz-Zentrum, Köln 1989, ISBN 3-9800233-7-0.
