= Stolberger Zink =

Mining company in Aachen, Germany

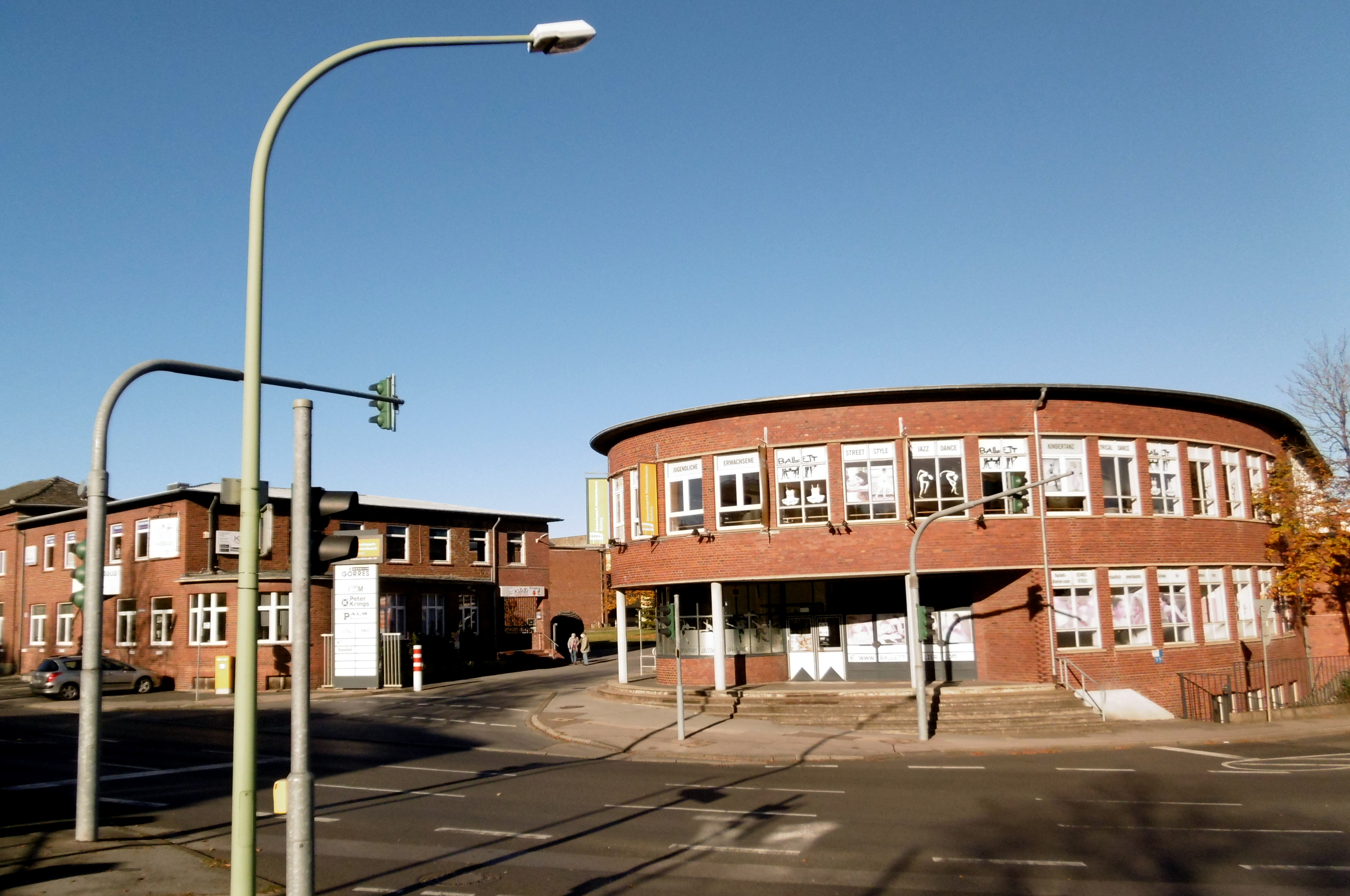
Administrative building of Stolberg Zinc opposite the Zinkhütter Hof Museum

Stolberg Zinc joint-stock company for mining and smelter operations in Aachen (Stolberger Zink-AG für Bergbau und Hüttenbetrieb Aachen), or Stolberg Zinc Mines GmbH (Stolberger Zink Bergwerke GmbH ), is a metal mining concern in the Aachen region and specifically in the area of Eschweiler-Stolberg, with headquarters in Stolberg.

Stolberg Zinc is the latest offshoot of a long line of metallurgical enterprises in Stolberg. It originated in 1938 with a name change from the Company for Mining, Lead and Zinc Production at Stolberg (French: Société anonyme des mines et des fonderies de zinc de Stolberg) - Stolberger Gesellschaft (Stolberg Company) for short.

Besides the Nievenheim zinc smelter at Dormagen there was their main zinc operation, the Münsterbusch zinc smelter, which was in operation until 1967, and the Binsfeldhammer lead smelter, which was acquired in 1970 by the Berzelius Duisburg company. Since then, it is primarily engaged in the management of properties, such as the sale of commercial space on the recultivated slag dump at Kohlbusch.

A subsidiary company was Silber- und Bleibergwerksgesellschaft AG zu Holzappel, in Laurenburg, Rhineland-Palatinate, as well as Gewerkschaft Mercur with headquarters in Bad Ems. Starting in the 1950s until 1968, Stolberg Zinc operated the open pit at Maubacher Bleiberg. In addition it held, respectively, mine properties or mine property shares in Bulgaria (Bergwerk-AG Pirin: Pirin Mine Company), Spain and Italy. In 1957, the Adolph-Helene pit in Altlay was leased, which, however, had to close only two years later.

== Stolberger Gesellschaft and Metallurgische Gesellschaft zu Stolberg ==
=== 1800s ===
In 1838. the Metallurgische Gesellschaft zu Stolberg (Metallurgical Company at Stolberg) was founded as a joint-stock company of merchants and mine owners. Its chief investor was James Crocker. It was the first of a long line of metallurgical enterprises in Stolberg that combined the mine properties and metal smelting. Also involved were, among others, Cockerill's brother John as well as Barthold Suermondt from Aachen, Friedrich Thyssen, manager of the Eschweiler wire factory, as well as Salomon Oppenheim, the Cologne banking firm.

Part of their corporate assets were the St. Heinrich Munsterbusch zinc smelter, the Herrenberg calamine mines, 49/64 shares in the Diepenlinchen lead and zinc mines as well as minor interests in the lead and zinc mines at Breinegerberg and Büsbacherberg. In 1840, the James Mine was taken over by the Metallurgischen Gesellschaft.

In 1841, the Metallurgische Gesellschaft leased all operating facilities to the Marquis de Sassenay, and was converted to the Kammanditgesellschaft de Sassenay & Cie. in die Stolberger Gesellschaft (de Sassenay & Co. Limited Partnership in the Stolberg Company).

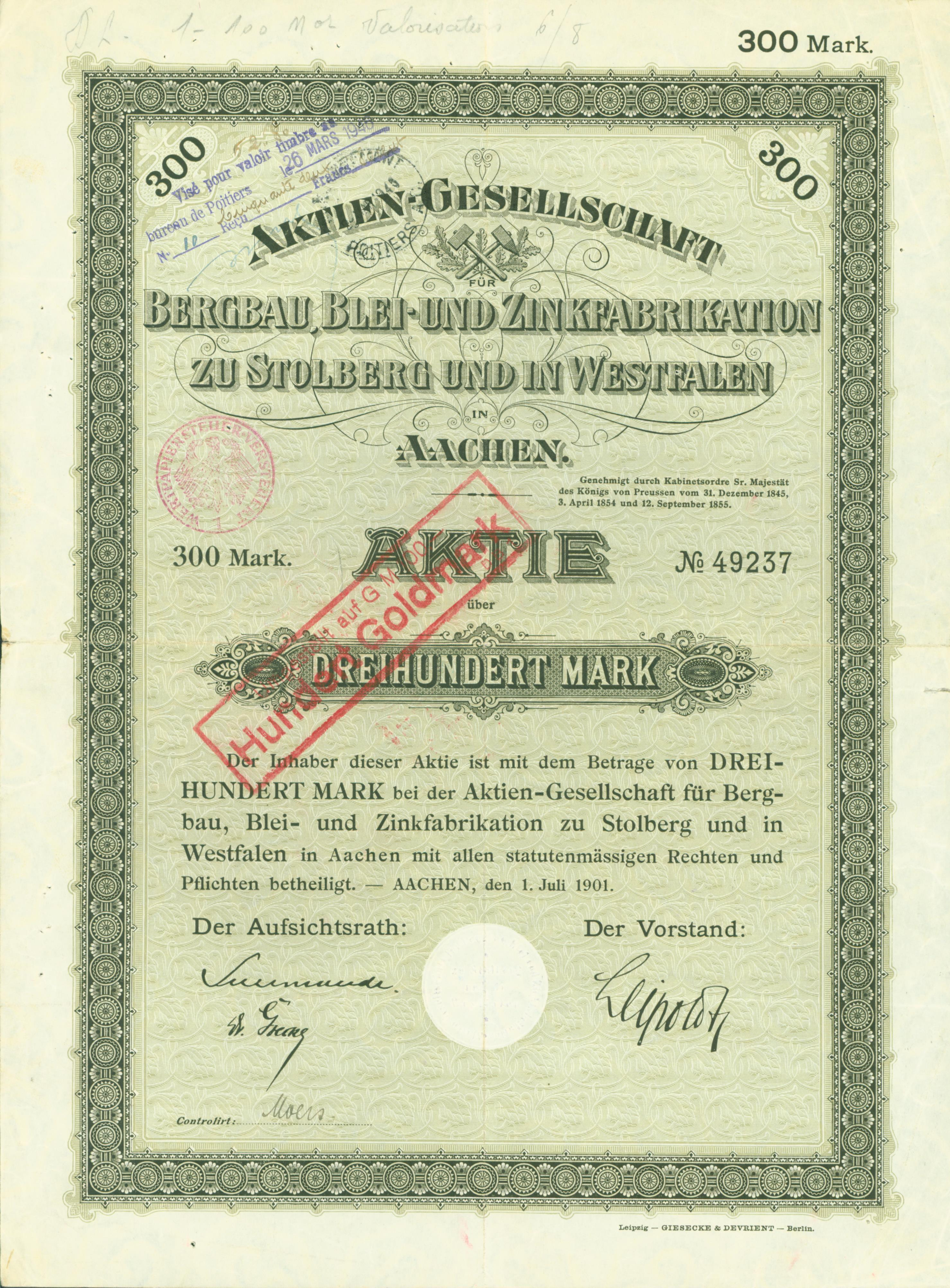
Share of the AG für Bergbau, Blei- und Zinkfabrikation zu Stolberg und in Westfalen, issued 1 July 1901

In 1845, through a conversion of the business organization after the adoption of the Prussian Securities Act of 1843, there arose in turn, from that Kommanditgesellschaft de Sassenay & Cie., the Gesellschaft für Bergbau, Blei- und Zinkfabrikation zu Stolberg (Company for Mining, Lead and Zinc Production at Stolberg; French: Société anonyme des mines et des fonderies de zinc de Stolberg), Stolberger Gesellschaft for short.

In 1848, from the joint stock company at Bleyberg es Muntzen the Stolberger Gesellschaft acquired the Münsterbusch lead and silver works, founded two years before, which operated until 1916, at what is now Schellerweg across from the Zinkhütter Hof.

As both of its predecessors had done, the Stolberger Gesellschaft covered its need for zinc and lead ore exclusively from the Stolberg deposits, especially from the Diepenlinchen ore mine. The 1853 merger with the Rheinisch-Westfälischen Bergwerksverein brought access to the rich lead and zinc deposits at Ramsbecker, and a name change to Gesellschaft für Bergbau und Zinkfabrikation zu Stolberg und in Westfalen (Mining and Zinc Production Company at Stolberg and Westphalia). In 1855, William von der Heydt of the Elberfelder banking family superseded the Marquis de Sassenay as the General Manager, and was able to overcome a business crisis. The Stolberg Company took over the Büsbacherberg-Brockenberg ore mine from the bankruptcy assets of the alliance.

=== 1900s ===
In 1909 the Stolberger Company also acquired the Emser Blei- und Silberwerk AG (Emser Lead and Silver Plant, AG)

In 1922, a joint operation was formed with the Eschweiler company, which then led to the merger with the Stolberger Gesellschaft in 1926. By the merger, the Gute Hoffnung Mine near Sankt Goarshausen came into the possession of the company.

By 1950 the Stolberg Company controlled the "Ernst" mine at Wiesloch for the production of zinc.

By the end of World War II, several mines including Wiesloch were flooded.

Twelve years later,2026 the name change to Stolberger Zink AG took place.

=== 2000s ===
Today, the business is called Solberger Telecom AG iL, and since July 17, 2002, has entered into insolvency proceedings.

== Sources and References ==
- Die Zeit. No. 30. July 25, 1957.
- Wolfgang David (1994). Grube "Consolidierte Gute Hoffnung" bei Wellmich-Werlau ["Consolidierte Gute Hoffnung" Pit near Wellmich-Werlau; Mining in the Rhine-Lahn District]. Kreisverwaltung Rhein-Lahn.
- "STOLBERGER TELECOM AG I.I. Aktie". On Vista.
