= Aloys Felke =

German politician and furniture manufacturer

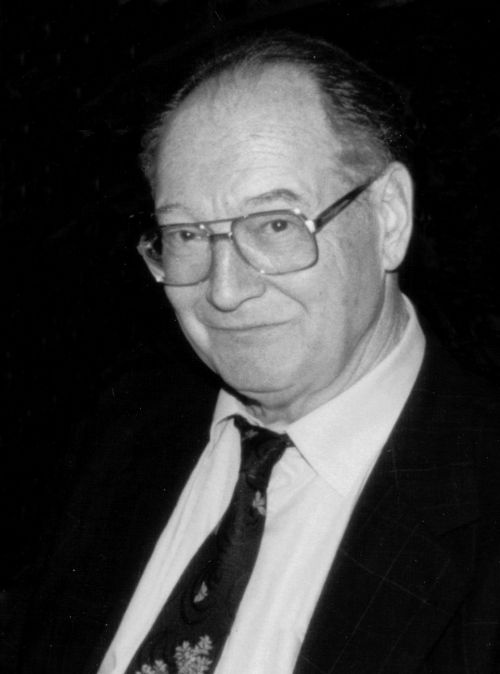
Aloys Felke.

Aloys Felke (20 February 1927 in Laufersweiler – 13 January 1997 in Sohren) was a German politician and furniture manufacturer.

== Life ==
In 1956 Aloys Felke started working with his two brothers Walter and Günter Felke as a business graduate in the manufacture of furniture, a firm founded by his father Michael Felke.

From 1969 to 1971 he was a representative of the Landtag of Rhineland-Palatinate for the CDU-Party.

Aloys Felke was married and father of two children.

== Distinctions ==
- 1984: Ehrennadel des Landes Rheinland-Pfalz
- 1995: Medal of Merit
