= Niederweiler, Rhein-Hunsrück =

Niederweiler
- Municipality
- Coat of arms

- Location of Niederweiler within Rhein-Hunsrück-Kreis district
- Interactive map of Niederweiler
- Location within Germany Location within Rhineland-Palatinate
- Coordinates: 49°54′37″N 7°17′7″E
- Country: Germany
- State: Rhineland-Palatinate
- District: Rhein-Hunsrück-Kreis
- Municipal assoc.: Kirchberg

Government
  - Mayor (2019–24): Harry Gutenberger

Area
  - Total: 4.81 km^{2} (1.86 sq mi)
- Elevation: 420 m (1,380 ft)

Population (2025-12-31)
  - Total: 419
  - Density: 87.1/km^{2} (226/sq mi)
- Time zone: UTC+01:00 (CET)
  - Summer (DST): UTC+02:00 (CEST)
- Postal codes: 55491
- Dialling codes: 06543
- Vehicle registration: SIM, GOA

Niederweiler (German pronunciation: [ˈniːdɐvaɪlɐ]) is an Ortsgemeinde – a municipality belonging to a Verbandsgemeinde, a kind of collective municipality – in the Rhein-Hunsrück-Kreis (district) in Rhineland-Palatinate, Germany. It belongs to the Verbandsgemeinde of Kirchberg, whose seat is in the like-named town.

== Geography ==
=== Location ===
The municipality is residential and characterized by agriculture and lies in the Hunsrück roughly 1 km south of Büchenbeuren. Just beyond Büchenbeuren is Frankfurt-Hahn Airport. Niederweiler's municipal area measures 4.81 km^{2}, of which 1.45 km^{2} is wooded.

== History ==
There are a great many prehistoric and Roman barrows on the Via Ausonia, a Roman road (called the Ausoniusstraße in German). Unearthed there in 1926 was a Roman site, apparently a grave monument from the 2nd century, with a hefty base and a balustraded enclosure. Some of the finds made there can now be found in the Bonn State Museum (Bonner Landesmuseum). This monument stood right next to a burial site (chariot burial) from Hallstatt times, roughly 600 to 500 BC, likely a Celtic prince's grave.

Niederweiler was first officially mentioned in a document in 1279. A bell from 1756 hangs in the tower at the municipal building.

Beginning in 1794, Niederweiler lay under French rule. In 1815 it was assigned to the Kingdom of Prussia at the Congress of Vienna. Since 1946, it has been part of the then newly founded state of Rhineland-Palatinate.

== Politics ==
=== Municipal council ===
The council is made up of 8 council members, who were elected by majority vote at the municipal election held on 7 June 2009, and the honorary mayor as chairman.

=== Mayor ===
Niederweiler's mayor is Harry Gutenberger, and his deputies are Franz Rudolf Theisen and Christoph Schmieden.

=== Coat of arms ===
The German blazon reads: In Rot eine eingeschweifte, von Blau und Gold geschachte Spitze; rechts eine silberne Urne, links zwei schräggekreuzte goldene Ähren.

The municipality's arms might in English heraldic language be described thus: Tierced in mantle, gules an urn argent, chequy Or and azure, and gules two ears of wheat each leafed of one per saltire of the third.

The silver urn on the dexter (armsbearer's right, viewer's left) side refers to the true Celtic archaeological finds within Niederweiler's limits. The ears of wheat on the sinister (armsbearer's left, viewer's right) side stand for the municipality's agricultural structure. The “chequy” pattern in the middle is a reference to the village's former allegiance to the County of Sponheim.

== Culture and sightseeing ==
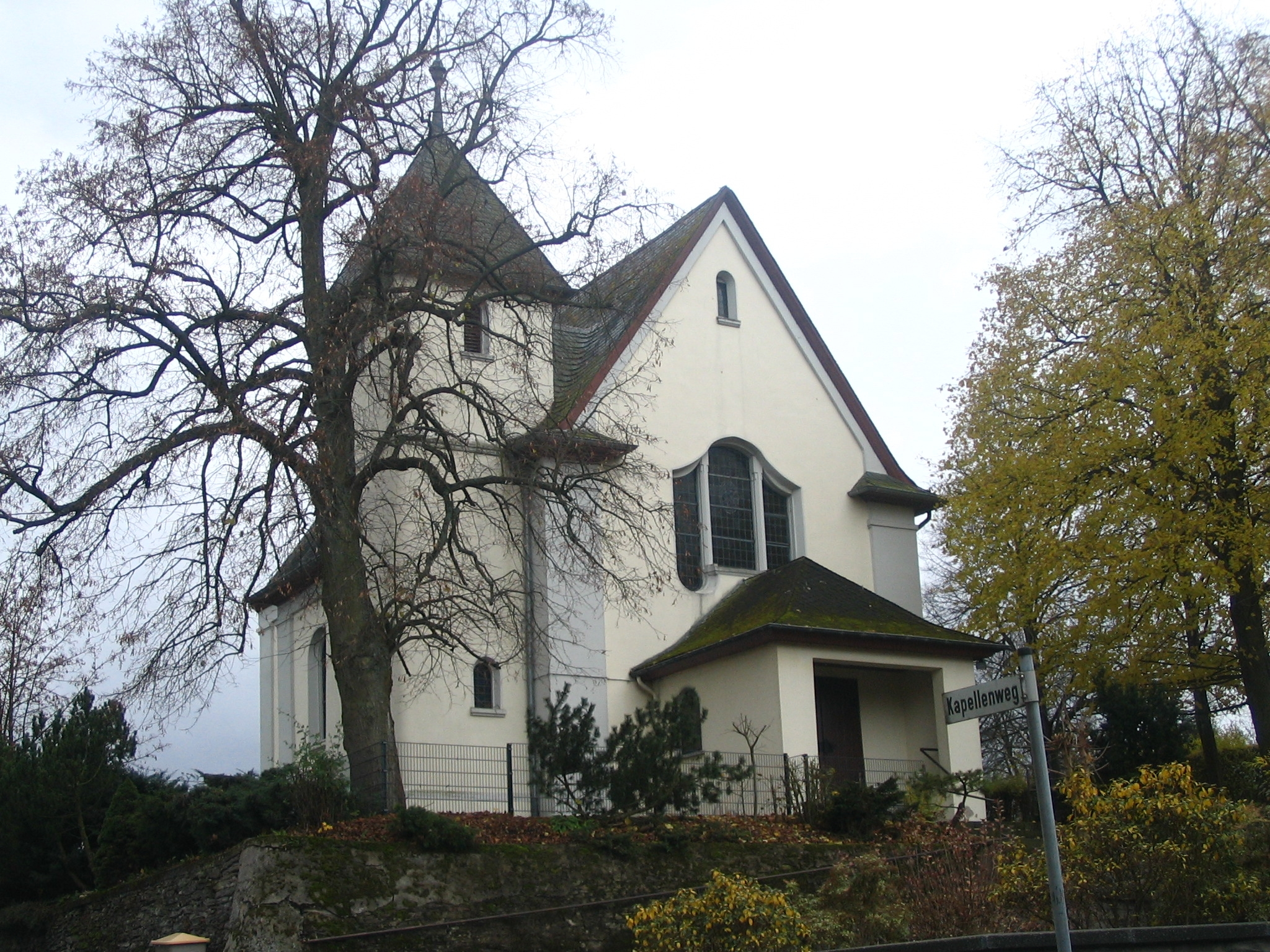
Chapel in the village centre

=== Buildings ===
The following are listed buildings or sites in Rhineland-Palatinate’s Directory of Cultural Monuments:

- Hauptstraße 8/10 – timber-frame semi-detached house, partly solid or slated, hipped mansard roof, 18th century, timber-frame barn, marked 1888; whole complex of buildings

==== Other sites ====
- Roman grave monument from the 2nd century with a balustraded enclosure, unearthed in 1926
- Catholic Chapel, modern building from 1914 to 1919
