= Belg =

- Municipality
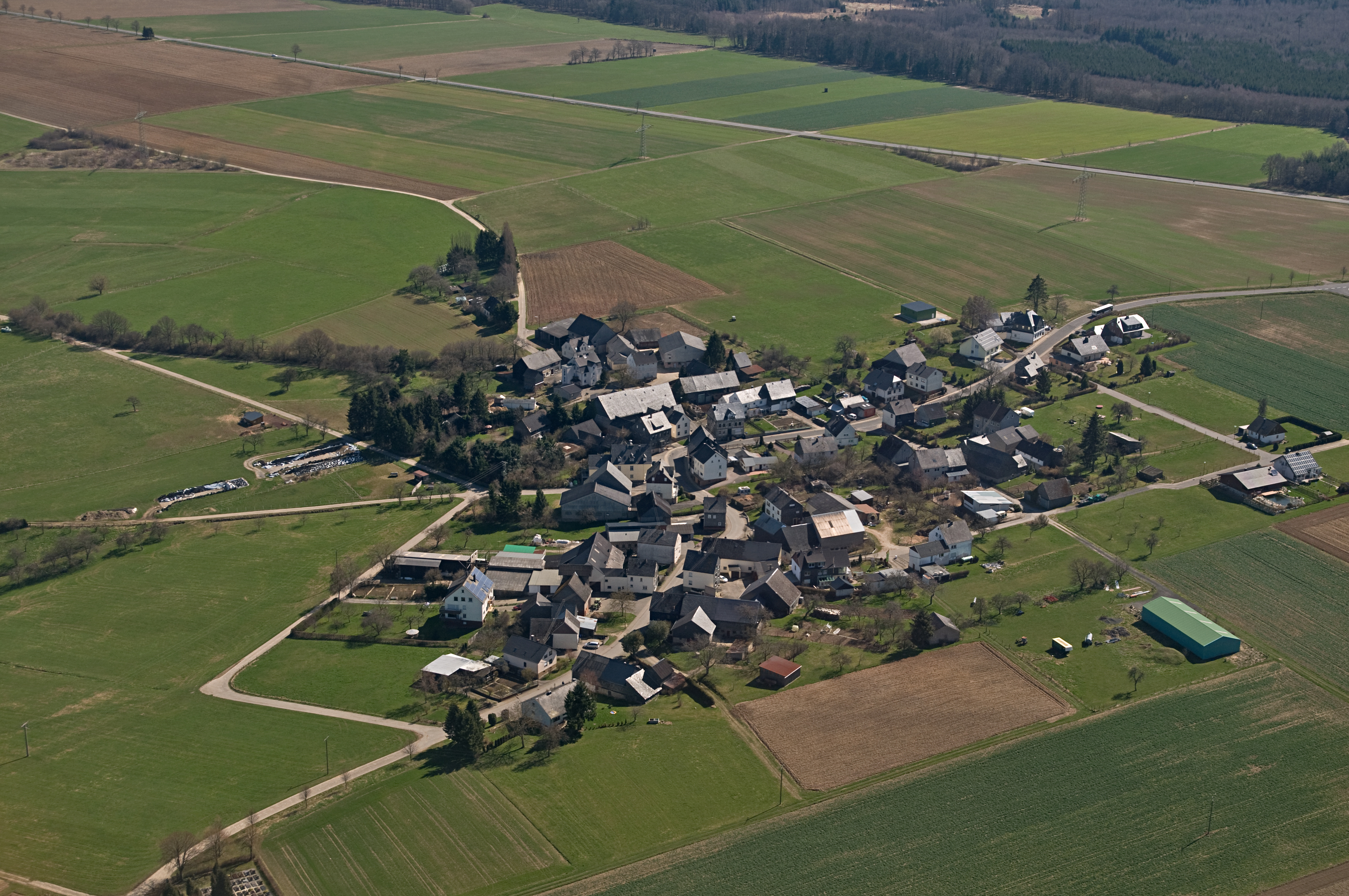

- Coat of arms

- Location of Belg within Rhein-Hunsrück-Kreis district
- Interactive map of Belg
- Location within Germany Location within Rhineland-Palatinate
- Coordinates: 49°59′05″N 7°18′34″E
- Country: Germany
- State: Rhineland-Palatinate
- District: Rhein-Hunsrück-Kreis
- Municipal assoc.: Kirchberg

Government
  - Mayor (2019–24): Karl-Heinz Schneider

Area
  - Total: 4.79 km^{2} (1.85 sq mi)
- Elevation: 440 m (1,440 ft)

Population (2025-12-31)
  - Total: 121
  - Density: 25.3/km^{2} (65.4/sq mi)
- Time zone: UTC+01:00 (CET)
  - Summer (DST): UTC+02:00 (CEST)
- Postal codes: 56858
- Dialling codes: 06543
- Vehicle registration: SIM

Belg (German pronunciation: [bɛlk]) is an Ortsgemeinde – a municipality belonging to a Verbandsgemeinde, a kind of collective municipality – in the Rhein-Hunsrück-Kreis (district) in Rhineland-Palatinate, Germany. It belongs to the Verbandsgemeinde of Kirchberg, whose seat is in the like-named town.

== Geography ==
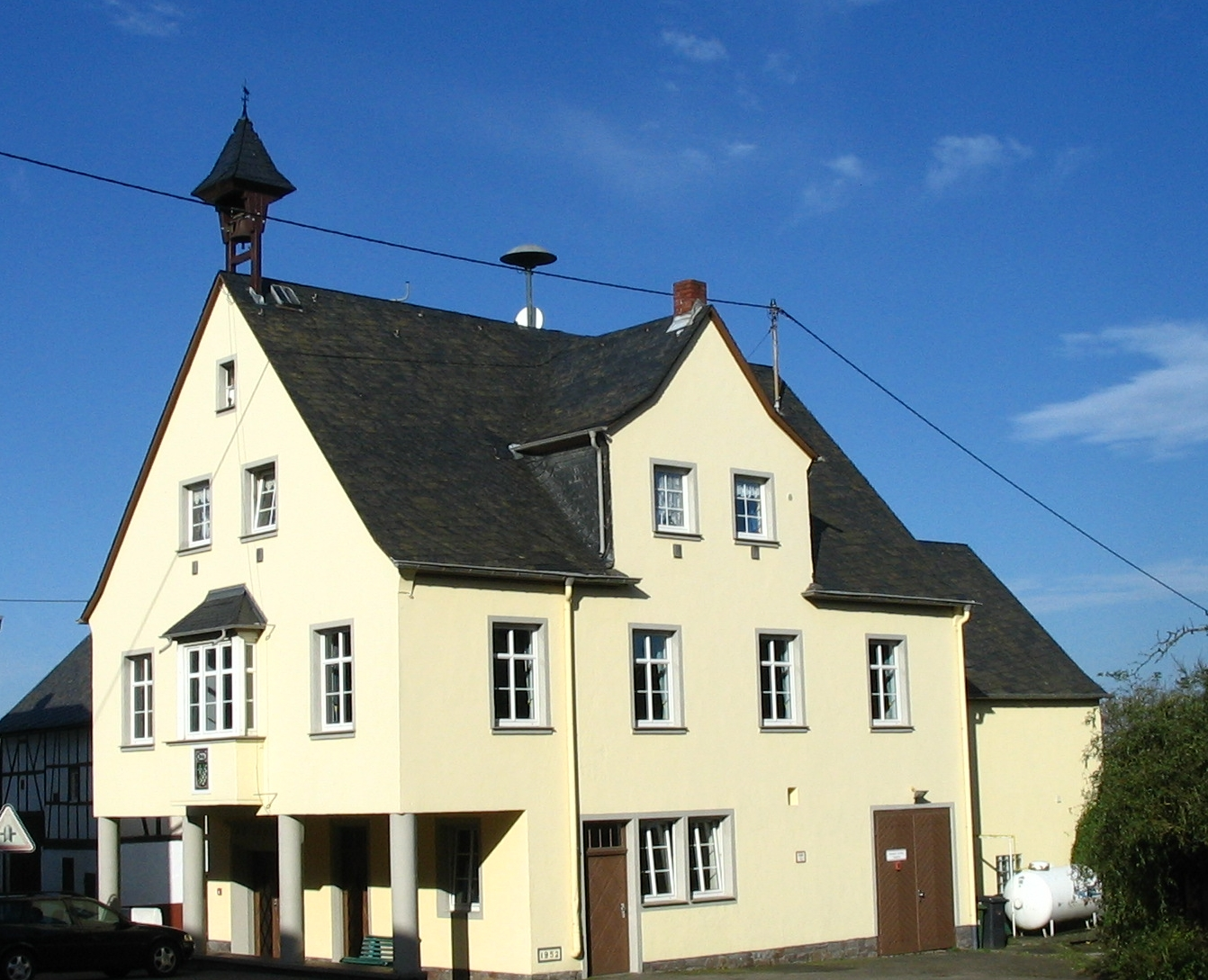
Parish hall in the village centre

The municipality lies in the central Hunsrück, right on the Hunsrückhöhenstraße (“Hunsrück Heights Road”, a scenic road across the Hunsrück built originally as a military road on Hermann Göring’s orders; the stretch running through Belg is nowadays designated Bundesstraße 327).

== History ==
In 1295, Belg had its first documentary mention in connection with the Counts of Sponheim. This noble house enfeoffed two others with estates. As early as the 11th century, slate was being mined in the Belger Bachtal (valley), and 15 mines were still being worked into the 20th century.

Beginning in 1794, Belg lay under French rule. In 1815 it was assigned to the Kingdom of Prussia at the Congress of Vienna. Since 1946, it has been part of the then newly founded state of Rhineland-Palatinate.

== Politics ==
=== Municipal council ===
The council is made up of 6 council members, who were elected at the municipal election held on 7 June 2009, and the honorary mayor as chairman.

=== Mayor ===
Belg’s mayor is Karl-Heinz Schneider, and his deputy is Klaus Bast.

=== Coat of arms ===
The German blazon reads: Schräglinks geteilt, vorn in Grün zwei schräggekreuzte silberne Hämmer, belegt mit einer silbernen Ähre, hinten geschacht von Gold und Blau.

The municipality’s arms might in English heraldic language be described thus: Per bend sinister vert a hammer and a sledge per saltire surmounted by an ear of wheat palewise couped argent, and chequy of forty-two Or and azure.

The ear of wheat on the dexter (armsbearer’s right, viewer’s left) side symbolizes agriculture, which for centuries held great importance to the municipality. This charge surmounts (that is, overlays) another, the hammer and the sledge, mining tools that recall the centuries of slate mining in the municipality. The tincture vert (green) refers to the municipality’s woodlands. The “chequy” pattern on the sinister (armsbearer's left, viewer's right) side refers to Belg's former allegiance to the “Further” County of Sponheim. It lay in the Oberamt of Kirchberg.
