= Altlay =

- Municipality
- Coat of arms

- Location of Altlay within Cochem-Zell district
- Interactive map of Altlay
- Location within Germany Location within Rhineland-Palatinate
- Coordinates: 49°59′15.66″N 7°16′14.75″E
- Country: Germany
- State: Rhineland-Palatinate
- District: Cochem-Zell
- Municipal assoc.: Zell (Mosel)

Government
  - Mayor (2019–24): Wolfgang Klein

Area
  - Total: 5.75 km^{2} (2.22 sq mi)
- Elevation: 300 m (980 ft)

Population (2025-12-31)
  - Total: 465
  - Density: 80.9/km^{2} (209/sq mi)
- Time zone: UTC+01:00 (CET)
  - Summer (DST): UTC+02:00 (CEST)
- Postal codes: 56858
- Dialling codes: 06543
- Vehicle registration: COC
- Website: www.altlay.de

Altlay is an Ortsgemeinde – a municipality belonging to a Verbandsgemeinde, a kind of collective municipality – in the Cochem-Zell district in Rhineland-Palatinate, Germany. It belongs to the Verbandsgemeinde of Zell, whose seat is in the municipality of Zell an der Mosel.

== Geography ==
The municipality lies in the north of the Hunsrück between Frankfurt-Hahn Airport (3 km to the south) and the Moselle at an elevation of some 300 m above sea level. North of the village, the Altlayer Bach flows through a narrow valley into the Moselle. Altlay lies 8 km southeast of Zell and 11 km northwest of the town of Kirchberg.

== History ==
As early as 1107, the municipality was mentioned under the name Leia. About 1489, slate mining near Altlay was mentioned. Beginning in 1794, Altlay lay under French rule. In 1815 it was assigned to the Kingdom of Prussia at the Congress of Vienna. Since 1946, it has been part of the then newly founded state of Rhineland-Palatinate. Under the Verwaltungsvereinfachungsgesetz (“Administration Simplification Law”) of 18 July 1970, with effect from 7 November 1970, the municipality was grouped into the Verbandsgemeinde of Zell.

== Politics ==
=== Municipal council ===
The council is made up of 8 council members, who were elected by majority vote at the municipal election held on 7 June 2009, and the honorary mayor as chairman.

=== Mayor ===
Altlay’s mayor is Wolfgang Klein, and his deputies are Werner Boos and Edgar Engelbach.

== Culture and sightseeing ==
=== Buildings ===
The following are listed buildings or sites in Rhineland-Palatinate’s Directory of Cultural Monuments:

- Saint Barbara’s Catholic Parish Church (Pfarrkirche St. Barbara), Hauptstraße 34 – Baroque aisleless church from 1771; outside: metal cross from 1775; mission cross from 1868.
- Near Fuchsstraße 8 – cast-iron cross.
- Hauptstraße 43 – estate complex along the street, timber-frame house, partly solid or slated, 18th/19th century; whole complex with commercial wings.
- Kuhtrift 10 – estate complex along the street, timber-frame house, partly solid, 19th century.
- Bleesmühle – timber-frame house, early 19th century.

== Economy and infrastructure ==
=== Slate mining ===
In the Altlayer Bach valley, slate was quarried on the surface after underground mining was given up in the 20th century. Underground mining, however, is once again being done now that new deposits have been opened that would have been too costly to work from the surface and would have adversely affected the appearance of the landscape. The great amount of mining spoil can also now be used to backfill earlier underground mineworks. In a Sponheim document from 20 June 1489, slate mining “near Altlay” is confirmed as having been undertaken as early as that time.

=== Nonferrous metal ores ===
Also mined in Altlay for centuries were nonferrous metal ores. Until 1959 at the Adolph-Helene pit, the Barbarasegen trade union mined, among others, lead, zinc, silver and copper ores. According to estimates, 384 000 t of ore was mined. There was also a narrow gauge railway from the pit to Zell for shipping the ore that had been dug up.

In 1957, the Adolph-Helene pit was let to the Stolberger Zink mining company, but they closed the operation only two years later. Falling metal ore prices had led to unprofitability. Although the prices later rose once more, the pit was deemed unworthy of opening again.

Today only remnants of the old industrial facilities can be seen. The headframe was torn down in the 1960s. The other buildings have fallen into ruins.
