= Emmelshausen (Verbandsgemeinde) =

Coordinates: 50.156°N 7.556°E

Emmelshausen is a former Verbandsgemeinde ("collective municipality") in the Rhein-Hunsrück district, in Rhineland-Palatinate, Germany. Its seat was in Emmelshausen. On 1 January 2020 it was merged into the new Verbandsgemeinde Hunsrück-Mittelrhein.

The Verbandsgemeinde Emmelshausen consisted of the following Ortsgemeinden ("local municipalities"):

1. Badenhard
2. Beulich
3. Bickenbach
4. Birkheim
5. Dörth
6. Emmelshausen
7. Gondershausen
8. Halsenbach
9. Hausbay
10. Hungenroth
11. Karbach
12. Kratzenburg
13. Leiningen
14. Lingerhahn
15. Maisborn
16. Mermuth
17. Morshausen
18. Mühlpfad
19. Ney
20. Niedert
21. Norath
22. Pfalzfeld
23. Schwall
24. Thörlingen
25. Utzenhain
