= Sankt Goar-Oberwesel =

German municipality

Coordinates: 50°06′40″N 7°43′17″E

Sankt Goar-Oberwesel is a former Verbandsgemeinde ("collective municipality") in the Rhein-Hunsrück district, in Rhineland-Palatinate, Germany. It is situated on the left bank of the Rhine, approx. 30 km southeast of Koblenz. Its seat was in Oberwesel. On 1 January 2020 it was merged into the new Verbandsgemeinde Hunsrück-Mittelrhein.

The Verbandsgemeinde Sankt Goar-Oberwesel consisted of the following Ortsgemeinden ("local municipalities"):

1. Damscheid
2. Laudert
3. Niederburg
4. Oberwesel
5. Perscheid
6. Sankt Goar
7. Urbar
8. Wiebelsheim
