= Badenhard =

- Municipality
- Coat of arms

- Location of Badenhard within Rhein-Hunsrück-Kreis district
- Interactive map of Badenhard
- Location within Germany Location within Rhineland-Palatinate
- Coordinates: 50°7′28″N 7°38′01″E
- Country: Germany
- State: Rhineland-Palatinate
- District: Rhein-Hunsrück-Kreis
- Municipal assoc.: Hunsrück-Mittelrhein

Government
  - Mayor (2019–24): Dirk Jost

Area
  - Total: 3.00 km^{2} (1.16 sq mi)
- Elevation: 435 m (1,427 ft)

Population (2025-12-31)
  - Total: 155
  - Density: 51.7/km^{2} (134/sq mi)
- Time zone: UTC+01:00 (CET)
  - Summer (DST): UTC+02:00 (CEST)
- Postal codes: 56291
- Dialling codes: 06746
- Vehicle registration: SIM

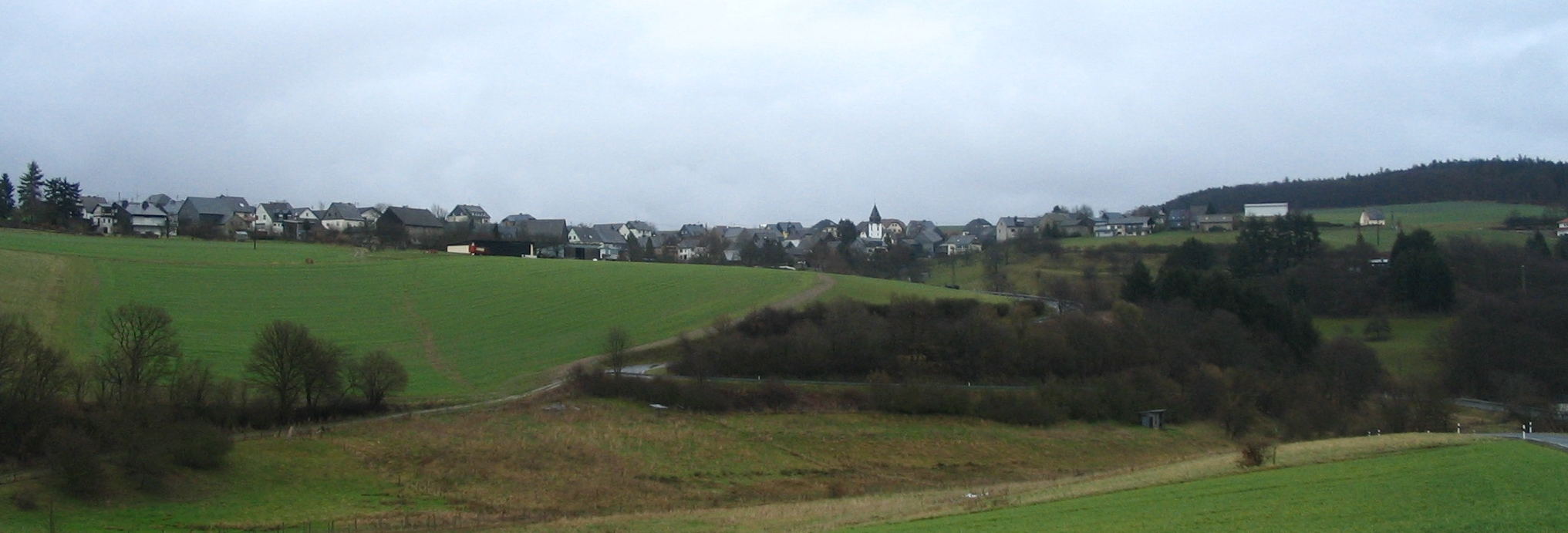
View of the village from the south

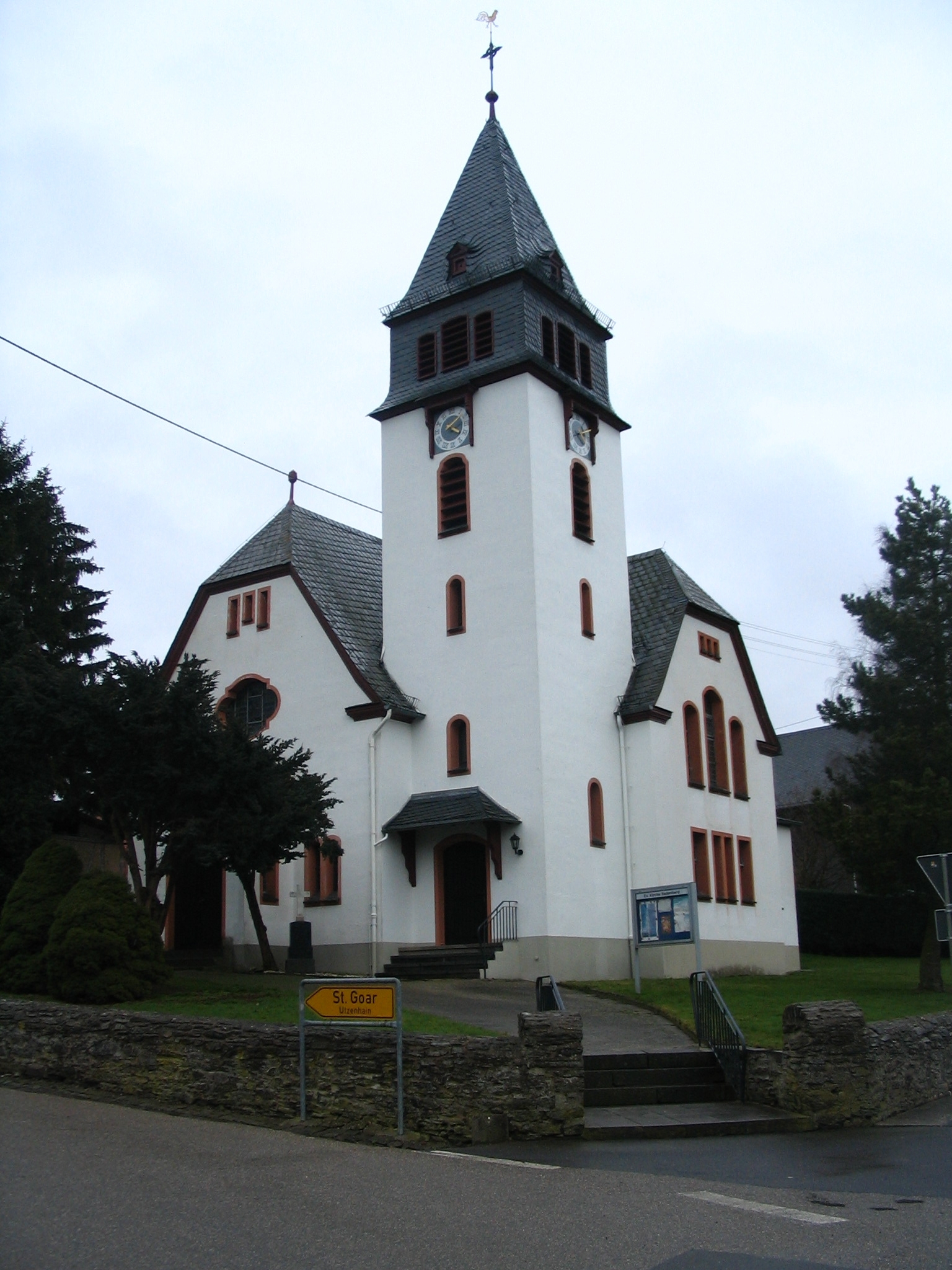
Evangelical church

Badenhard is an Ortsgemeinde – a municipality belonging to a Verbandsgemeinde, a kind of collective municipality – in the Rhein-Hunsrück-Kreis (district) in Rhineland-Palatinate, Germany. It belongs to the Verbandsgemeinde Hunsrück-Mittelrhein having its administration in Emmelshausen.

== Geography ==
=== Location ===
Badenhard is located on a high ridge in the east Hunsrück, between the Middle Rhine valley and the Autobahn A 61.

=== Neighbouring municipalities ===
Next to Badenhard there are Utzenhain and Birkheim.

== History ==
The feudal landholders were until the French occupation in 1794 the Counts of Katzenelnbogen and the Landgraviate of Hesse. In 1815, Badenhard was assigned to the Kingdom of Prussia at the Congress of Vienna. In 1908, the building of the local church was financed by a local woman. Since 1946, it has been part of the then newly founded state of Rhineland-Palatinate.

== Religion ==
The municipality’s majority is Evangelical.

== Politics ==
=== Municipal council ===
The council is made up of 6 council members, who were elected by majority vote at the municipal election held on 7 June 2009, and the honorary mayor as chairman.

=== Mayor ===
Badenhard’s mayor is Dirk Jost.

=== Coat of arms ===
The German blazon reads: In geteiltem Schild oben in Gold drei rote Eichenblätter nebeneinander, unten in Blau zwei silberne Ähren.

The municipality’s arms might in English heraldic language be described thus: In the split shield above in gold three oak leaves next to next, the bottom in blue with two silver ears of wheat argent.

The Ortsgemeinde of Badenhard is even today a community well defined by agriculture and forestry. The oakleaves refer to the broadleaf forests, and the ears of wheat to agriculture. While the charges refer to the municipality itself, the tinctures refer to the old feudal landholders, the Counts of Katzenelnbogen and the Landgraviate of Hesse.

== Culture and sightseeing ==
=== Buildings ===
In the following are listed buildings or sites in Rhineland-Palatinate’s Directory of Cultural Monuments:

- Evangelical church, Schloßstraße 1 – Baroque Revival-Art Nouveau building with T-shaped floor plan, 1908/1909

== Economy and infrastructure ==
=== Transport ===
Badenhard is located only a few kilometres away from Autobahn A 61.
