= Niederburg (disambiguation) =

Niederburg may refer to:

- Niederburg, a municipality in Rhineland-Palatinate, Germany
- Niederburg, part of the old town of Konstanz, Germany
- Niederburg (boat, 1960), an old passenger ferry at Konstanz, Germany

Niederburg may also refer to the following castles in Germany:

- Niederburg, the German castle term for an outer ward that is lower than its associated inner ward
- Niederburg, Büren, a ruined castle in Büren, Westphalia
- Niederburg, Kobern, a ruined castle in Kobern, Rhineland-Palatinate
- Niederburg, Kranichfeld, a castle in Kranichfeld, Thuringia
- Niederburg Castle, a ruined castle in the municipality of Niederburg, Rhineland-Palatinate
- Niederburg, one of the two castles of Manderscheid
- Brömserburg (AKA Niederburg) in Rüdesheim am Rhein, Hesse
- Schloss Liebieg in Gondorf, Rhineland-Palatinate
