= Dörth =

- Municipality
- Coat of arms

- Location of Dörth within Rhein-Hunsrück-Kreis district
- Interactive map of Dörth
- Location within Germany Location within Rhineland-Palatinate
- Coordinates: 50°8′56.48″N 7°35′23.50″E
- Country: Germany
- State: Rhineland-Palatinate
- District: Rhein-Hunsrück-Kreis
- Municipal assoc.: Hunsrück-Mittelrhein

Government
  - Mayor (2019–24): Achim Seis

Area
  - Total: 5.16 km^{2} (1.99 sq mi)
- Elevation: 465 m (1,526 ft)

Population (2025-12-31)
  - Total: 545
  - Density: 106/km^{2} (274/sq mi)
- Time zone: UTC+01:00 (CET)
  - Summer (DST): UTC+02:00 (CEST)
- Postal codes: 56281
- Dialling codes: 06747
- Vehicle registration: SIM
- Website: www.doerth.de

Dörth is an Ortsgemeinde – a municipality belonging to a Verbandsgemeinde, a kind of collective municipality – in the Rhein-Hunsrück-Kreis (district) in Rhineland-Palatinate, Germany. It belongs to the Verbandsgemeinde Hunsrück-Mittelrhein, whose seat is in Emmelshausen.

== Geography ==
=== Location ===
The municipality lies in the Hunsrück about 2.5 km east of Emmelshausen on the Autobahn A 61. Sankt Goar lies roughly 8 km to the east, and the river Rhine’s nearest approach to Dörth is at Hirzenach, an outlying centre of Boppard, roughly 5 km to the northeast.

== History ==
In 1334, Dörth was first mentioned by name. It first arose as a clearing village and was once called Denrod (the —rod ending stems from the same root as the German verb roden, meaning “clear”, with reference to woods). In the latter half of the 14th century, the villagers forsook Dörth for a few years, but it is believed that the village was reoccupied within a decade. In 1375, Dörth had its first documentary mention. The actual document deals with an agreement in which the agreed sharing of tithes from the area under the Gallscheid Court's (Gallscheider Gericht) jurisdiction between the Provost of Saint Martin's Foundation at Worms and his chapter is recorded. Dörth was grouped with those villages that had to pay the tithe not to the Provost, but rather to the chapter. The tithe lord (or Decimator) in Dörth was until 1521 Saint Martin's Foundation at Worms. Old documents speak of Denrod or Dinrod. The villagers worked mainly at farming and in the forest.

Beginning in 1521, the Decimator was the Elector of Trier. Since the village belonged to the Electorate of Trier, it remained Roman Catholic even through the upheavals over religion in the 16th century. The parish seat as far back as is known has been Halsenbach, although Saint Quentin’s Church in Karbach was nearer than the parish church in Halsenbach. Beginning in 1556, Saint Quentin’s was likewise part of the parish of Halsenbach. Dörth was one of the smallest villages in the parish, and at the onset of the Thirty Years' War had no more than five hearths (households).

Towards the end of the 17th century, there must have been some kind of small population explosion. Two effects that this had in the earlier half of the 18th century cannot be overlooked: a chapel was built, and so was a school.

At the beginning of the 19th century, Dörth, like all the lands on the Rhine’s left bank, lay under French rule. The French brought fundamental changes to the Rhineland: they swept away both tithes and serfdom. After French rule ended some 20 years later, Dörth passed along with the Rhineland to the Kingdom of Prussia under the terms of the Congress of Vienna, becoming part of the Rhine Province. In 1816, within the newly formed Sankt Goar district, Dörth at first remained in the Amtsbürgermeisterei of Pfalzfeld, as it had been in French times. As a result of the villagers’ wishes, however, it was grouped together in 1817 with Karbach into the Amt of Halsenbach, thus reinstating the structure from Electoral-Trier times. Between 1922 and 1925, a new church and a new school were built.

In the First and Second World Wars, 52 men from the municipality fell or went missing in action. Since 1946, Dörth has been part of the then newly founded state of Rhineland-Palatinate. In the late 1940s, with currency reform and the establishment of the Federal Republic of Germany, there was once more solid ground to stand on. Dörth became the seat of the new parish. The economic upswing in the 1950s and 1960s and the gradual industrialization also took root in the Hunsrück. Where once the Celts and the Romans built their ancient roads, the Autobahn along the Rhine's left bank sprang up. Dörth has an Autobahn interchange within its municipal limits (although it is called Emmelshausen). In the outlying locality of Hirtenau are found a maintenance depot and the Autobahn police.

== Politics ==
=== Municipal council ===
The council is made up of 12 council members, who were elected by majority vote at the municipal election held on 7 June 2009, and the honorary mayor as chairman.

=== Mayor ===
Dörth's mayor is Thomas Blum.

=== Coat of arms ===
The German blazon reads: Schild durch eine gestürzte Spitze gespalten, darin ein wachsendes goldenes Kreuz, belegt mit blauem Schwert; vorne ein rotes Balkenkreuz in Silber; hinten ein silberner Balken in Rot.

The municipality's arms might in English heraldic language be described thus: Tierced in mantle reversed, argent a cross abased gules, azure issuant from base a cross Latin, the dexter and sinister arms couped short of the lines of partition, Or surmounted by a sword palewise, the point to base, of the field, and gules a fess abased of the first.

The red cross on the dexter (armsbearer's right, viewer's left) side is the armorial device formerly borne by the Electorate of Trier, thus denoting the village's allegiance in the Middle Ages. The silver fess on the sinister (armsbearer's left, viewer's right) side is from the arms once borne by the Gallscheid Court (Gallscheider Gericht), thus referring to the local jurisdiction then. The charges in the middle, the gold cross and the blue sword, stand for Philip the Apostle and James the Elder, who are the municipality's patron saints.

== Culture and sightseeing ==
=== Buildings ===
The following are listed buildings or sites in Rhineland-Palatinate’s Directory of Cultural Monuments:

- Saint Philip’s and Saint James’s Catholic Parish Church (Pfarrkirche St. Philippus und Jakobus), Hauptstraße 7 – aisleless church, 1922/1923
- Schulstraße 7 – timber-frame Quereinhaus (a combination residential and commercial house divided for these two purposes down the middle, perpendicularly to the street), partly solid and slated, half-hipped roof, early 19th century; whole complex of buildings

== Economy and infrastructure ==
Dörth lies between the Autobahn A 61 (Emmelshausen interchange) and the Hunsrückhöhenstraße ("Hunsrück Heights Road", a scenic road across the Hunsrück built originally as a military road on Hermann Göring's orders). About a kilometre outside the village lies the Dörth industrial park with some 80 businesses and some 1,000 jobs.
