= Damscheid =

- Municipality
- Coat of arms

- Location of Damscheid within Rhein-Hunsrück-Kreis district
- Interactive map of Damscheid
- Location within Germany Location within Rhineland-Palatinate
- Coordinates: 50°6′12″N 7°40′59″E
- Country: Germany
- State: Rhineland-Palatinate
- District: Rhein-Hunsrück-Kreis
- Municipal assoc.: Hunsrück-Mittelrhein

Government
  - Mayor (2019–24): Peter Kuhn

Area
  - Total: 15.10 km^{2} (5.83 sq mi)
- Elevation: 340–360 m (1,120–1,180 ft)

Population (2025-12-31)
  - Total: 668
  - Density: 44.2/km^{2} (115/sq mi)
- Time zone: UTC+01:00 (CET)
  - Summer (DST): UTC+02:00 (CEST)
- Postal codes: 55432
- Dialling codes: 06744
- Vehicle registration: SIM
- Website: www.damscheid.de

Damscheid is an Ortsgemeinde – a municipality belonging to a Verbandsgemeinde, a kind of collective municipality – in the Rhein-Hunsrück-Kreis (district) in Rhineland-Palatinate, Germany. It belongs to the Verbandsgemeinde Hunsrück-Mittelrhein, whose seat is in Emmelshausen.

== Geography ==
=== Location ===
The municipality lies in the Hunsrück on a narrow ridge (330 m above sea level) bordered in the north by the Niederbach (brook) and in the south by the Engehöller Tal (dale). A broad belt of forest in the west forms the link between the Damscheider Land – the village's local area – and the Hunsrück plateau.

== History ==
Damscheid is believed to have had its beginnings during the period of widespread forest clearing in Carolingian times. Lending weight to this belief is the worship of the Frankish saint, Aldegonde. Nevertheless, it is known that humans had settled here earlier than the Franks, for the foundations of Roman buildings and remnants of a water supply line have been unearthed.

In 1256, Damscheid had its first documentary mention and got its first church sometime between 1150 and 1200. Indeed, Damscheid's oldest and at the same time most striking building work is the square churchtower with its pointed helm roof. It bears witness to Damscheid's having had a role in the Hunsrück's power structures long before the first documentary mention. It was once a defensive tower, and according to expert opinion, was built between 1130 and 1150. Arrowslits, some of which can still be made out, show that the tower had a defensive function in the Middle Ages.

Damscheid was under the lordship of the Electorate of Trier. The village belonged until 1783 to Saint Martin's Collegiate Foundation in Oberwesel, and for a short while also to Saint Stephen's Parish Church (Pfarrkirche St. Stefan) in Niederburg. About 1785, Damscheid became a parish in its own right.

The market was first mentioned in the 1767 Oberwesel Council Order. In 1802, the chapel was mentioned. A promotional group around police president Malmen built a new, small chapel in 1975. Since then, a religious service has been held each year in the middle of the forest to commemorate the old pilgrimage church that once stood here, which was consecrated to Saint Aldegonde, after whom the Aldegundesmarkt (market) is also named. The long vanished pilgrimage church was first mentioned in 1477.

In the Thirty Years' War, Spanish troops pillaged the village, and then came Swedish troops, who did the same thing. Although the village was not burnt down, as the troops had threatened to do, the church was all but destroyed anyway. As early as 1682, however, the church had been built again.

It was more than one hundred years before the village finally managed to recover from the war's aftermath. In 1759, Damscheid had only 30 hearths (for this, read “households”) and some 200 inhabitants. By 1789, the population had risen to 290. In the course of the 19th century, the number rose to just under 500, a level that remained fairly constant up until 1990, since which time it has risen to 682.

Beginning in 1716, there was a school in Damscheid. In 1798, a completely new school with two classrooms was built. In 1971, the local school was consolidated with school services in Oberwesel. The old school building, however, still serves as a kindergarten.

Beginning in 1794, Damscheid lay under French rule. Under French rule, the municipality was, from 1798, grouped into the Mairie (“Mayoralty”) of Wiebelsheim. Later it belonged to the Amt in Oberwesel. In 1815 it was assigned to the Kingdom of Prussia at the Congress of Vienna. Since 1946, it has been part of the then newly founded state of Rhineland-Palatinate, and since 1972, it has been part of the Verbandsgemeinde of Sankt Goar-Oberwesel.

In 2006, Damscheid celebrated its 750-year jubilee of first documentary mention.

== Politics ==
=== Municipal council ===
The council is made up of 12 council members, who were elected by majority vote at the municipal election held on 7 June 2009, and the honorary mayor as chairman.

=== Mayor ===
Damscheid's mayor is Peter Kuhn.

=== Coat of arms ===
The German blazon reads: In silber vor grün gespaltenem Schilde vorn eine grüne Fichte, hinten ein silberner Gitterrost.

The municipality's arms might in English heraldic language be described thus: Per pale argent issuant from base a spruce tree vert and vert a gridiron palewise, the handle to base, of the first.

The charge on the dexter (armsbearer's right, viewer's left) side, the spruce tree, refers to the municipality's great wealth of woodland, while the charge on the sinister (armsbearer's left, viewer's right) side, the gridiron, is Saint Lawrence's attribute, thus representing the municipality's patron saint.

== Culture and sightseeing ==
=== Buildings ===
The following are listed buildings or sites in Rhineland-Palatinate’s Directory of Cultural Monuments:

- Saint John’s Catholic Parish Church (Pfarrkirche St. Johannes), St. Johann-Straße 11a, St. Aldegundis Straße – Romanesque west tower, about 1150; Late Gothic baptismal chapel built onto the quire, about 1450; Baroque aisleless chapel, 1682; graveyard; Repentance cross, marked 1844; warriors’ memorial, a chapel-like complex with relief; whole complex of buildings with church and graveyard

=== Sport and leisure ===
Owing to its location between the Rhine valley and the wooded heights of the Hunsrück, Damscheid offers various hiking opportunities.

== Economy and infrastructure ==
Damscheid was once characterized by winegrowing, and indeed, a few winemakers are still to be found, but they are growing fewer. Located in Damscheid are a few small handicraft and industrial-art businesses such as roofers and sanitary fitting firms.

Damscheid is home to many commuters, as the Autobahn A 61 to the west and the Rhine valley to the east are only a few kilometres away.

== Famous people ==
- Friedel Muders (b. 21 May 1953 in Damscheid) is a German record producer and designer of record and CD covers.
