= Halsenbach =

- Municipality
- Coat of arms

- Location of Halsenbach within Rhein-Hunsrück-Kreis district
- Interactive map of Halsenbach
- Location within Germany Location within Rhineland-Palatinate
- Coordinates: 50°10′34″N 7°33′02″E
- Country: Germany
- State: Rhineland-Palatinate
- District: Rhein-Hunsrück-Kreis
- Municipal assoc.: Hunsrück-Mittelrhein
- Subdivisions: 4

Government
  - Mayor (2019–24): Rita Lenz

Area
  - Total: 9.89 km^{2} (3.82 sq mi)
- Elevation: 410 m (1,350 ft)

Population (2025-12-31)
  - Total: 1,288
  - Density: 130/km^{2} (337/sq mi)
- Time zone: UTC+01:00 (CET)
  - Summer (DST): UTC+02:00 (CEST)
- Postal codes: 56283
- Dialling codes: 06747
- Vehicle registration: SIM

Halsenbach (German pronunciation: [ˈhalzn̩bax]) is an Ortsgemeinde – a municipality belonging to a Verbandsgemeinde, a kind of collective municipality – in the Rhein-Hunsrück-Kreis (district) in Rhineland-Palatinate, Germany. It belongs to the Verbandsgemeinde Hunsrück-Mittelrhein, whose seat is in Emmelshausen.

== Geography ==
=== Location ===
The municipality lies in the Hunsrück about 2 km north of Emmelshausen and roughly 7 km west of the Rhine. The municipality's area is 1 003 ha and its elevation is 410 m above sea level.

=== Constituent communities ===
Three outlying communities belong to Halsenbach named Ehr, Ehrerheide and Mermicherhof.

== History ==
During building work on the Autobahn A 61 (Ludwigshafen-Koblenz), an Iron Age burying ground was unearthed, and in 1971 a dig was conducted there. The burying ground itself is a group of 13 individual barrows arranged along a trail leading across the Hunsrück and in places the heights along the Rhine, which was expanded in Roman times. For some of the cremations, the barrow was raised right over the charred funeral pyre. Among the grave goods that were worthiest of note were an open-worked belthook and an iron belt ring. The ceramics that were preserved, among them a thrown clay bottle, date the burying ground to the later Hunsrück-Eifel Culture (eras IIA to IIB), or the second fourth of the 5th century BC to the earlier half of the 3rd century BC.

In the Middle Ages, the village belonged to the Gallenscheider Gericht (“Gallenscheid Court”) and thereby, beginning in the 14th century, to the Electorate of Trier. Beginning in 1794, Halsenbach lay under French rule. In 1815 it was assigned to the Kingdom of Prussia at the Congress of Vienna. Since 1946, it has been part of the then newly founded state of Rhineland-Palatinate.

Halsenbach lies almost on the Hunsrückbahn. When this railway was built about 1900, though, “Halsenbach Station” was built so far from the village that a new village quickly sprang up there. Since then, the amalgamation of the outlying centre of Ehr has put Halsenbach itself on the line, and it now has its own station.

== Politics ==
=== Municipal council ===
The council is made up of 16 council members, who were elected by majority vote at the municipal election held on 7 June 2009, and the honorary mayor as chairman.

=== Mayor ===
Halsenbach's mayor is Rita Lenz.

=== Coat of arms ===
Halsenbach's arms with tinctures

The German blazon reads: Das Wappen zeigt in Blau einen golden bekleideten Bischof, wachsend hinter einem roten Schild, darin ein silberner Balken.

The municipality's arms might in English heraldic language be described thus: Azure in base an inescutcheon gules charged with a fess argent, standing behind which a bishop proper vested and mitred Or holding in his dexter hand a book and in his sinister a bishop's staff sable.

The rendition of the arms shown in this section was assembled from the black-and-white version shown at the head of the article with tinctures as prescribed by the German blazon. However, this blazon does not prescribe tinctures for the bishop's staff, book (presumably a Bible) or skin. The first two have been rendered sable (black) and the last “proper” (that is, in natural colour), as this is likely what was intended.

The bishop who stands as the main charge in these arms is Saint Lambert, to whom the village church, built in 1712 and 1713, is consecrated. The inescutcheon with the fess goes back to a seal used by the Schöffen (roughly “lay jurists”) until the late 18th century and thereby refers to Halsenbach's history as the seat of the “Gallscheid Court”.

== Culture and sightseeing ==
=== Buildings ===
The following are listed buildings or sites in Rhineland-Palatinate’s Directory of Cultural Monuments:

==== Halsenbach ====
- Saint Lambert’s Church (Kirche St. Lambertus), Hinter dem Rathaus 1 – aisleless church, 1758-1759, architect A. Seiz, expansion 1835-1838, north side nave chapel 1896, reconstruction 1923, expansion 1960–62, architect O. Vogel, earlier building’s tower and portal, marked 1713; at the quire a Baroque crucifix; whole complex of buildings with rectory
- Ehrer Straße – graveyard; basalt cross, Baroque Body of Christ; basalt grave cross, 1750
- At Hinter dem Rathaus 2 – wrought-iron cross, 18th century
- Hunsrückbahn (monumental zone) – section of the railway line built in 1906-1908, one of the Prussian State Railway’s steepest lines.
- On Kreisstraße (District Road) 110, northeast of the village – Dörther Brücke; three-arch sandstone-block bridge, 1908

==== Ehr ====
- Im Hof 3 – timber-frame house, partly solid, 19th century, addition 19th century

==== Mermicherhof ====
- Railway bridge, on Kreisstraße 112 going towards Kratzenburg – stone bridge on the Hunsrückbahn

== Economy and infrastructure ==
=== Transport ===
A good kilometre northeast of Emmelshausen, where the bypass road meets the old alignment of the Hunsrückhöhenstraße ("Hunsrück Heights Road", a scenic road across the Hunsrück built originally as a military road on Hermann Göring’ 's orders), District Road K108 branches off to the northwest, leading to Halsenbach, Ney and Dieler. In the village centre, District Road K110 coming from Ehr meets Hauptstraße (“Main Street”). To the south, through the Preisbach's deep valley, cross-country paths lead to Liesenfeld and the Baunhöller Mühle (mill).

=== Established businesses ===
There are many businesses in the village. In the former factory spaces that once housed the musical instrument manufacturer Wersi, several businesses are now housed.
