= Hunsrück-Mittelrhein =

Collective municipality in Rhineland-Palatinate, Germany

- Verbandsgemeinde
- Location of Hunsrück-Mittelrhein within Rhein-Hunsrück-Kreis district
- Interactive map of Hunsrück-Mittelrhein
- Location within Germany Location within Rhineland-Palatinate
- Coordinates: 50°09′N 7°33′E
- Country: Germany
- State: Rhineland-Palatinate
- District: Rhein-Hunsrück-Kreis
- Seat: Emmelshausen
- Subdivisions: 33 municipalities

Area
  - Total: 233.47 km^{2} (90.14 sq mi)

Population (2025-12-31)
  - Total: 24,197
  - Density: 103.64/km^{2} (268.43/sq mi)
- Time zone: UTC+01:00 (CET)
  - Summer (DST): UTC+02:00 (CEST)
- Website: hunsrueckmittelrhein.de

Hunsrück-Mittelrhein is a Verbandsgemeinde ("collective municipality") in the Rhein-Hunsrück-Kreis, Rhineland-Palatinate, Germany. The seat of the Verbandsgemeinde is in Emmelshausen, with a branch office in Oberwesel.

It was formed on 1 January 2020 by the merger of the former Verbandsgemeinden Emmelshausen and Sankt Goar-Oberwesel.

== List of municipalities ==
The Verbandsgemeinde Hunsrück-Mittelrhein consists of the following Ortsgemeinden ("local municipalities"):

1. Badenhard (Note: Formerly part of the then-Verbandsgemeinde of Emmelshausen.)
2. Beulich
3. Bickenbach
4. Birkheim
5. Damscheid (Note: Formerly part of the then-Verbandsgemeinde of Sankt Goar-Oberwesel.)
6. Dörth
7. Emmelshausen
8. Gondershausen
9. Halsenbach
10. Hausbay
11. Hungenroth
12. Karbach
13. Kratzenburg
14. Laudert
15. Leiningen
16. Lingerhahn
17. Maisborn
18. Mermuth
19. Morshausen
20. Mühlpfad
21. Ney
22. Niederburg
23. Niedert
24. Norath
25. Oberwesel
26. Perscheid
27. Pfalzfeld
28. Sankt Goar
29. Schwall
30. Thörlingen
31. Urbar
32. Utzenhain
33. Wiebelsheim
