= Morshausen =

- Municipality
- Coat of arms

- Location of Morshausen within Rhein-Hunsrück-Kreis district
- Interactive map of Morshausen
- Location within Germany Location within Rhineland-Palatinate
- Coordinates: 50°11′27″N 7°26′23″E
- Country: Germany
- State: Rhineland-Palatinate
- District: Rhein-Hunsrück-Kreis
- Municipal assoc.: Hunsrück-Mittelrhein

Government
  - Mayor (2019–24): Hans-Peter Friedrich

Area
  - Total: 7.56 km^{2} (2.92 sq mi)
- Elevation: 334 m (1,096 ft)

Population (2025-12-31)
  - Total: 330
  - Density: 44/km^{2} (110/sq mi)
- Time zone: UTC+01:00 (CET)
  - Summer (DST): UTC+02:00 (CEST)
- Postal codes: 56283
- Dialling codes: 02605
- Vehicle registration: SIM
- Website: www.gemeinde-morshausen.de

Morshausen is an Ortsgemeinde – a municipality belonging to a Verbandsgemeinde, a kind of collective municipality – in the Rhein-Hunsrück-Kreis (district) in Rhineland-Palatinate, Germany. It belongs to the Verbandsgemeinde Hunsrück-Mittelrhein, whose seat is in Emmelshausen.

== Geography ==
=== Location ===
The municipality lies in the Hunsrück, 6 km from the Moselle and 10 km from Emmelshausen, at an elevation of 334 m above sea level.

== Politics ==
=== Municipal council ===
The council is made up of 8 council members, who were elected by majority vote at the municipal election held on 7 June 2009, and the honorary mayor as chairman.

=== Mayor ===
Morshausen's mayor is Hans-Peter Friedrich.

=== Coat of arms ===
The German blazon reads: Über einem Schildfuß, darin ein goldener Stutzwecken, in silbernem Feld ein schwarzer, linksgewendeter Schwengelbrunnen.

The municipality's arms might in English heraldic language be described thus: Argent a well boom with pail to sinister sable, on a base vert a Stutzweck Or.

The well, which stands as the main charge, was endowed in the 15th century by a Hungarian countess who was married at the Ehrenburg (castle). In remembrance of her homeland, the well was built in the style of those typically seen in the Puszta region. The woodwork has been renewed at regular intervals by the municipality ever since, and the well may still be seen on Brunnenstraße (“Well Street”). The Stutzweck is a traditional baked article, and in Morshausen, it stems from a citizen's bequest in 1782. He bequeathed his belongings to the municipality on the proviso that a good field be acquired, and that the rent drawn therefrom be used to bake Stutzwecken during Holy Week and to buy wine. On Maundy Thursday, all the village's poor, wretched and children were to come together in the church to pray for his poor soul and to eat the Stutzwecken dipped in the wine in observance of the Lord's Supper. The Stutzweck is still shared out to the churchgoers each year on Good Friday after midday devotions.

== Culture and sightseeing ==
=== Buildings ===
The following are listed buildings or sites in Rhineland-Palatinate’s Directory of Cultural Monuments:

- Saint Lambert's Catholic Church (branch church; Filialkirche St. Lambert), Kirchstraße 1 – aisleless church, 1739/1740, architect possibly J. Neurohr, Romanesque Revival quarrystone tower, 1848; whole complex of buildings with graveyard
- Brunnenstraße – well, timber construction, originally from the 17th century, renovated
- Kirchstraße 8 – estate complex, whole complex of buildings; timber-frame house, partly solid, 18th or 19th century
- Kornstraße 6 – former town hall and bakehouse; representative timber-frame building, partly solid, half-hipped roof, 18th century
- Bildstock, on Landesstraße (State Road) 206 going towards Beulich – basalt relief, marked 1741
