= Maisborn =

- Municipality
- Coat of arms

- Location of Maisborn within Rhein-Hunsrück-Kreis district
- Interactive map of Maisborn
- Location within Germany Location within Rhineland-Palatinate
- Coordinates: 50°4′56″N 7°34′49″E
- Country: Germany
- State: Rhineland-Palatinate
- District: Rhein-Hunsrück-Kreis
- Municipal assoc.: Hunsrück-Mittelrhein

Government
  - Mayor (2019–24): Reinhold Lauderbach

Area
  - Total: 1.47 km^{2} (0.57 sq mi)
- Elevation: 508 m (1,667 ft)

Population (2025-12-31)
  - Total: 134
  - Density: 91.2/km^{2} (236/sq mi)
- Time zone: UTC+01:00 (CET)
  - Summer (DST): UTC+02:00 (CEST)
- Postal codes: 56291
- Dialling codes: 06746
- Vehicle registration: SIM

Maisborn is an Ortsgemeinde – a municipality belonging to a Verbandsgemeinde, a kind of collective municipality – in the Rhein-Hunsrück-Kreis (district) in Rhineland-Palatinate, Germany. It belongs to the Verbandsgemeinde Hunsrück-Mittelrhein, whose seat is in Emmelshausen.

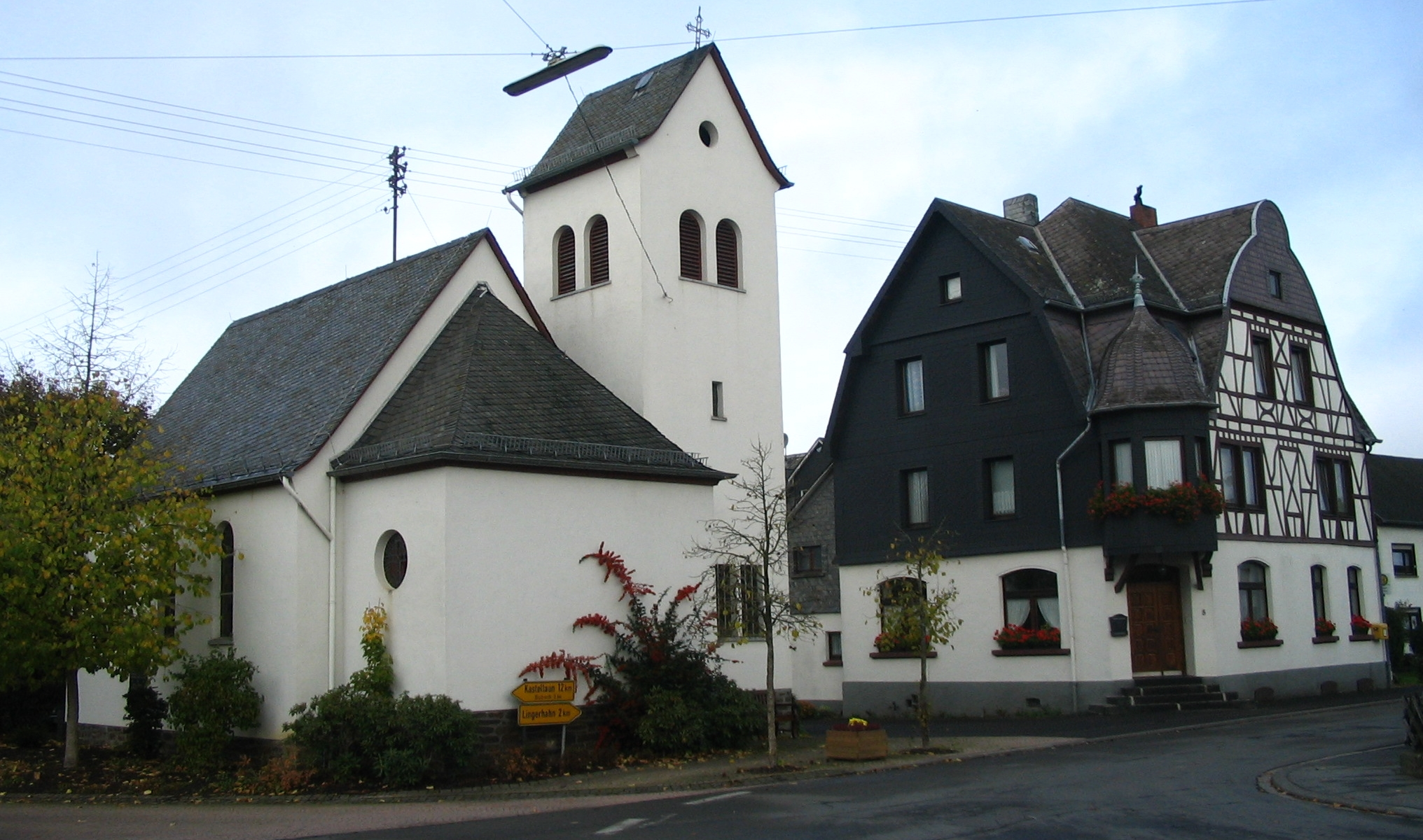
Maisborn village centre

== Geography ==
=== Location ===
The municipality lies in the Hunsrück roughly 10 km east of Kastellaun and 10 km west of the Rhine at Oberwesel. The municipal area measures 1.47 km². Maisborn has the highest elevation of any municipality in the Verbandsgemeinde of Emmelshausen – 508 m above sea level.

== History ==
In 1275, Maisborn had its first documentary mention. Evidence shows that it was later held by the Lords of Milwalt, who in 1330 enfeoffed Archbishop of Trier Baldwin with half of the Maisborn Court. In the 15th century, the village somehow ended up with the Duchy of Palatinate-Simmern, although it is not known how this happened. Beginning in 1673, Maisborn belonged to the Electorate of the Palatinate. Beginning in 1794, Maisborn lay under French rule. In 1815 it was assigned to the Kingdom of Prussia at the Congress of Vienna. Since 1946, it has been part of the then newly founded state of Rhineland-Palatinate.

== Politics ==
=== Municipal council ===
The council is made up of 8 council members, who were elected by majority vote at the municipal election held on 7 June 2009, and the honorary mayor as chairman.

=== Mayor ===
Maisborn's mayor is Reinhold Lauderbach.

=== Coat of arms ===
The German blazon reads: Gespalten vorne in Schwarz ein rotbewehrter, -gezungter und -gekrönter goldener Löwe, hinten unter blau-gold geschachtem Feld in Silber ein blauer Schalenbrunnen mit geteiltem Wasserstrahl.

The municipality's arms might in English heraldic language be described thus: Per pale sable a lion rampant Or armed, langued and crowned gules, and argent a basin fountain with divided stream of water issuant therefrom azure under a chief in sinister only countercompony of the last and the second.

The charge on the dexter (armsbearer's right, viewer's left) side, the Palatine Lion, recalls Maisborn's former allegiance to the Electorate of the Palatinate. The countercompony (that is, with two chequered rows) “half-chief” – something never seen in English heraldry – on the sinister (armsbearer's left, viewer's right) side recalls the village's former allegiance to the “Further” County of Sponheim, which bore arms “chequy” (that is, with the escutcheon’s whole field chequered) in these two tinctures (blue and gold). The fountain is a canting charge for the village’s name ending, —born, which means “fountain” (although, as can be seen in the German blazon, the usual German word is Brunnen; Schalenbrunnen means “basin fountain”). However, the fountain also refers to the wealth of springwater found within municipal limits.

== Culture and sightseeing ==
=== Buildings ===
The following are listed buildings or sites in Rhineland-Palatinate’s Directory of Cultural Monuments:

- Wall complex, roughly 1 km west of Maisborn – so-called Römerwall (“Roman wall”); roughly 800 m-long wall, possibly a remnant of a mediaeval border structure.
