= Gondershausen =

- Municipality
- Coat of arms

- Location of Gondershausen within Rhein-Hunsrück-Kreis district
- Interactive map of Gondershausen
- Location within Germany Location within Rhineland-Palatinate
- Coordinates: 50°09′38″N 7°29′29″E
- Country: Germany
- State: Rhineland-Palatinate
- District: Rhein-Hunsrück-Kreis
- Municipal assoc.: Hunsrück-Mittelrhein

Government
  - Mayor (2019–24): Markus Landsrath

Area
  - Total: 13.45 km^{2} (5.19 sq mi)
- Elevation: 400 m (1,300 ft)

Population (2025-12-31)
  - Total: 1,317
  - Density: 97.92/km^{2} (253.6/sq mi)
- Time zone: UTC+01:00 (CET)
  - Summer (DST): UTC+02:00 (CEST)
- Postal codes: 56283
- Dialling codes: 06745
- Vehicle registration: SIM
- Website: www.ortsgemeinde-gondershausen.de

Gondershausen is an Ortsgemeinde – a municipality belonging to a Verbandsgemeinde, a kind of collective municipality – in the Rhein-Hunsrück-Kreis (district) in Rhineland-Palatinate, Germany. It belongs to the Verbandsgemeinde Hunsrück-Mittelrhein, whose seat is in Emmelshausen.

== Geography ==
=== Location ===
The municipality lies in the northernmost part of the Hunsrück between the Baybach and Ehrbach valleys to the north and south, and the Rhine and the Moselle in the east and west.

== History ==
Barrows in Schorfeld, Steinmelt, Lampenheck and Scheidwald bear witness to early human habitation in the Gondershausen area in Hallstatt times (1000-400 BC). Vessels and ironware have also been unearthed locally at some of the newer barrows. These date from La Tène times (400-100 BC). By about 50 BC, the most influential culture was the Roman Empire. The Romans built watermains and were the first to use bricks in the region. Eventually, they also brought the first contact with Christianity.

The antiquarian Johann Christian von Stramberg noted that in AD 367, “Roman riders came by way of Guntershusin and in a dale found a few cottages, called Pichenbach.” Christianization came between 400 and 600.

In 893, King Arnulf donated holdings to St. Maximin's Benedictine Abbey in Trier. Gondershausen, however, is not mentioned by name, though there is an etching in the document.

On 13 June 897, Gondershausen had its first documentary mention as Guntereshusen when King Arnulf's donations were confirmed by his son Zwentibold. Gunter here is a personal name while the ending —husen was used by the Franks for a settlement in the heights. Sometime between 900 and 1084, the parish of Gondershausen was established. On 4 October 1084, Gondershausen was restored to St. Maximin's Abbey after a certain “Luitoldus” had unlawfully taken ownership. The first known priest in Gondershausen was the one serving in 1153 whose name was “Corardus”. In 1200, St. Maximin's Abbey relinquished its claim to Gondershausen and ownership then passed to the Counts Palatine.

Sometime in the 11th or 12th century, Gondershausen's first church, a Romanesque building, was built. The 12th century also saw two castles built nearby, Castle Waldeck and Castle Schöneck, whose lords wielded influence and rights throughout the area. On 7 May 1285, Guntirshusen passed to Conrat zu Schonecke, whereupon the landlords at Waldeck and Schöneck once again divided up their holdings.

In 1332, the robber knight Heinrich von Waldeck, called von Renneberg, endowed the local church. His bequest was 15 Denare for the priest at Gondershausen, while the church itself got 2 marks. In 1399, Wynant von Waldeck was mentioned as having been made the village's Vogt (roughly “reeve”). The next year, Peter von Schöneck was mentioned as being the fiefholder at Gondershausen, as was Cuno von Schöneck later, in 1462. In 1410, King Ruprecht of the Palatinate bequeathed Gondershausen to the House of Palatinate-Simmern.

In 1443, Saint Anthony's Church (St. Antonius Kirche) in Niedergondershausen (“Lower Gondershausen”) was mentioned for the first time. An old Gondershausen court seal from 1466 stands as the earliest reference to Saint Servatius as the parish patron.

In 1508, the House of Schöneck died out with Georg von Schöneck, who bequeathed to the parish priest hunting and fishing rights on the condition that he say Mass in return on an ongoing basis. In 1598, Simmern, and thereby Gondershausen too, passed back to Electoral Palatinate.

The 17th century brought the Thirty Years' War, and along with it a Spanish invasion and the Plague in 1620 and 1621. In 1631 came the Swedes from the Moselle. They reintroduced Calvinism and drove out the Catholic priest, Konrad Blumenthal, who had taken over the parish in 1625.

In 1650 there was widespread hunger in Gondershausen, and the famine was so serious that the villagers were even trading land for bread.

In 1685, there was a school in Gondershausen for the first time. The village's first schoolteacher was Burkhard Ross. This same year also brought freedom of religion. In 1689 there was a feud between the townsmen of Simmern and the peasants of Gondershausen over a sum of money lent the former. The latter group won, and the Simmerners suffered one death among them as a result.

Beginning in 1794, Gondershausen lay under French rule. The French swept the old mediaeval order away. In 1797, they abolished tithes; serfdom, too, was all but banned. In 1815 Gondershausen was assigned to the Kingdom of Prussia at the Congress of Vienna. In the years 1820 to 1830, and again from 1860 to 1870, there were waves of emigration to the United States and the Ruhr area. Between these two periods, the year 1846 was marked by a great crop failure.

The early 20th century brought with it a railway, the Hunsrückbahn between Simmern and Boppard. However, it also brought the First World War, in which Gondershausen lost 45 men. The 1930s saw the rise of the Nazis and the Third Reich. This resulted in the construction of the Hunsrückhöhenstraße (“Hunsrück Heights Road”, a scenic road across the Hunsrück built originally as a military road on Hermann Göring’s orders), but also in the outbreak of the Second World War. This claimed 76 Gondershausen men’s lives. Also, near the municipality itself, a USAAF bomber was shot down and the crew was forced to make an emergency landing. On 15 March 1945 the Americans marched in from the Moselle, meeting very little resistance from German forces. Most of the villagers had sought shelter in mine galleries in the Baybach valley.

Since 1946, Gondershausen has been part of the then newly founded state of Rhineland-Palatinate. In 1958, Flurbereinigung was undertaken. On 1 April 1969, the municipality of Gondershausen was newly formed out of what had until then been two self-administering municipalities, Niedergondershausen (“Lower Gondershausen”, with 673 inhabitants) and Obergondershausen (“Upper Gondershausen”, with 465 inhabitants).

On 11 April 1973, Gondershausen was officially recognized as a recreation resort (Erholungsort) by the State Technical Committee for Spas (Landesfachausschuß für Kurorte). In 1979, Gondershausen's new coat of arms was introduced. An official municipal flag followed in January 1996. In 2010, a solar park was brought into service.

== Politics ==
=== Municipal council ===
The council is made up of 16 council members, who were elected by proportional representation at the municipal election held on 7 June 2009, and the honorary mayor as chairman. The 16 seats on council are shared between two voters’ groups. The 2004 election was based on majority vote.

=== Mayor ===
Gondershausen's mayor is Markus Landsrath.

=== Coat of arms ===
The German blazon reads: In gespaltenem Schild vorne in Schwarz ein rotbewehrter, -gezungter und -gekrönter goldener Löwe, hinten in Silber ein schwarzer Bischofsstab belegt mit einer roten Mitra.

The municipality's arms might in English heraldic language be described thus: Per pale sable a lion rampant Or armed, langued and crowned gules, and argent a bishop's staff of the first surmounted by a mitre of the third.

The charge on the dexter (armsbearer's right, viewer's left) side, the Palatine Lion, stands for the village's former allegiance to the Counts Palatine, while the charges on the sinister (armsbearer's left, viewer's right) side, a bishop's staff and a mitre, are a holy bishop's attributes, as shown on a court seal on a 1466 document from Gontershusen.

== Culture and sightseeing ==
=== Buildings ===
The following are listed buildings or sites in Rhineland-Palatinate’s Directory of Cultural Monuments:

- Saint Anthony the Abbot's Catholic Church (branch church; Filialkirche St. Antonius Abbas), Rhein-Mosel-Straße – Romanesque Revival quarrystone aisleless church, 1842–1844, tower expansion 1869, rebuilt in 1950 after war damage
- Saint Servatius’s Catholic Parish Church (Pfarrkirche St. Servatius), Rhein-Mosel-Straße – three-naved brick pseudobasilica, 1863–1865, mediaeval west tower, raised about 1740; churchyard, tomb slab, marked 1786; sandstone cross from a Crucifixion group, marked 1784; whole complex of buildings with parish hall
- Schulstraße/corner of Friedhofsweg – Baroque crucifix at Saint Anthony's Chapel (St.-Antonius-Kapelle)
- Hübelstraße 17 – timber-frame Quereinhaus (a combination residential and commercial house divided for these two purposes down the middle, perpendicularly to the street), half-hipped roof, early 19th century
- Rhein-Mosel-Straße 89 – estate complex along the street; timber-frame building, partly solid, marked 1763
- Schulstraße 44 – timber-frame Quereinhaus, partly solid and slated, 19th century
- Jagdhaus Mäuseberg (hunting lodge) – not open to the public
- Chapel, near the Schultheisser Mühle (mill) – Baroque aisleless church, 18th century, wooden cross marked 1774

=== Clubs ===
There has been a music club since 1970 (Musikverein Gondershausen), and the fire brigade was founded in 1930.
