= Hungenroth =

- Municipality
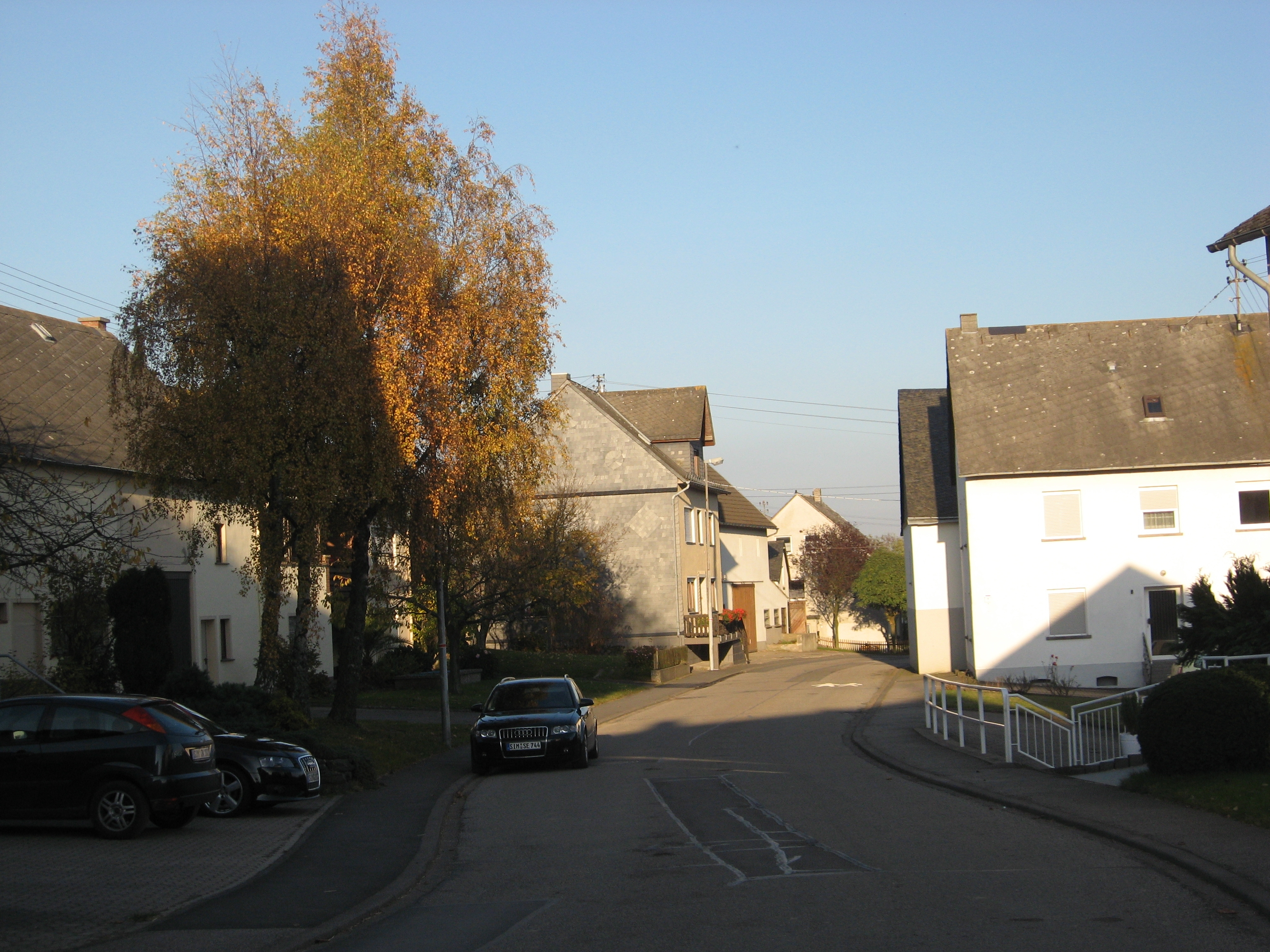
- Main street in Hungenroth

- Coat of arms

- Location of Hungenroth within Rhein-Hunsrück-Kreis district
- Interactive map of Hungenroth
- Location within Germany Location within Rhineland-Palatinate
- Coordinates: 50°8′34.98″N 7°36′0.70″E
- Country: Germany
- State: Rhineland-Palatinate
- District: Rhein-Hunsrück-Kreis
- Municipal assoc.: Hunsrück-Mittelrhein

Government
  - Mayor (2019–24): Alexander Wehr

Area
  - Total: 5.94 km^{2} (2.29 sq mi)
- Elevation: 450 m (1,480 ft)

Population (2025-12-31)
  - Total: 278
  - Density: 46.8/km^{2} (121/sq mi)
- Time zone: UTC+01:00 (CET)
  - Summer (DST): UTC+02:00 (CEST)
- Postal codes: 56281
- Dialling codes: 06746
- Vehicle registration: SIM
- Website: www.hungenroth.de

Hungenroth (German pronunciation: [ˈhʊŋənʁoːt]) is an Ortsgemeinde – a municipality belonging to a Verbandsgemeinde, a kind of collective municipality – in the Rhein-Hunsrück-Kreis (district) in Rhineland-Palatinate, Germany.

== Geography ==
=== Location ===
The municipality lies on a ridge in the eastern Hunsrück between the Middle Rhine and the Autobahn A 61.

== History ==
Hungenroth belonged until the latter half of the 15th century to the Lordship of Schöneck and thereafter, as an unredeemed pledge to the Vogtei of Pfalzfeld in the Lower County of Katzenelnbogen or their rightful successors, the Landgraves of Hesse and the Lords of Hesse-Rheinfels. Beginning in 1794, Hungenroth lay under French rule. In 1815 it was assigned to the Kingdom of Prussia at the Congress of Vienna. Since 1946, it has been part of the then newly founded state of Rhineland-Palatinate.

== Politics ==
=== Municipal council ===
The council is made up of 6 council members, who were elected by majority vote at the municipal election held on 7 June 2009, and the honorary mayor as chairman.

=== Mayor ===
Hungenroth's mayor is Alexander Wehr.

=== Coat of arms ===
The German blazon reads: Im geteilten Schild, oben in Rot ein silberner Pflug, unten in Gold ein blaugekrönter herschauender roter Löwe.

The municipality's arms might in English heraldic language be described thus: Per fess gules a plough argent and Or a lion passant guardant, tail forked, of the first armed, langued and crowned azure.

The field tinctures gules and Or (red and gold) refer to the village's former landholders. Until the latter half of the 15th century, Hungenroth belonged to the Lordship of Schöneck, passing next as an unredeemed pledge to the Counts of Katzenelnbogen. Both landholders’ coats of arms bore the same two tinctures. The silver plough symbolizes the woodland clearing, which surely took place under the Schönecks, and which is mentioned in the last syllable of the municipality's name (the —roth ending stems from the same root as the German verb roden, meaning “clear”, with reference to woods). The charge in the lower half of the escutcheon refers to the village's later status as part of the Vogtei of Pfalzfeld in the Lower County of Katzenelnbogen and that body's rightful successors.

== Culture and sightseeing ==
=== Buildings ===
The following are listed buildings or sites in Rhineland-Palatinate's Directory of Cultural Monuments:

- Gründelbachstraße 5: L-shaped estate; timber-frame house, partly slated, 19th century

=== Clubs ===
- TTC Hungenroth 1965 e.V. (table tennis)
- Verein für Heimatpflege e.V. Hungenroth (heritage)
