= Urbar, Rhein-Hunsrück =

Urbar
- Municipality
- Coat of arms

- Location of Urbar within Rhein-Hunsrück-Kreis district
- Interactive map of Urbar
- Location within Germany Location within Rhineland-Palatinate
- Coordinates: 50°7′51.94″N 7°43′9.52″E
- Country: Germany
- State: Rhineland-Palatinate
- District: Rhein-Hunsrück-Kreis
- Municipal assoc.: Hunsrück-Mittelrhein

Government
  - Mayor (2019–24): Heinz Link

Area
  - Total: 3.55 km^{2} (1.37 sq mi)
- Elevation: 242 m (794 ft)

Population (2025-12-31)
  - Total: 680
  - Density: 190/km^{2} (500/sq mi)
- Time zone: UTC+01:00 (CET)
  - Summer (DST): UTC+02:00 (CEST)
- Postal codes: 55430
- Dialling codes: 06741
- Vehicle registration: SIM
- Website: www.urbar-loreley.de

Urbar is an Ortsgemeinde – a municipality belonging to a Verbandsgemeinde, a kind of collective municipality – in the Rhein-Hunsrück-Kreis (district) in Rhineland-Palatinate, Germany. It belongs to the Verbandsgemeinde Hunsrück-Mittelrhein, whose seat is in Emmelshausen. From 1974 to 1999, Urbar was a Stadtteil of Oberwesel; however, with effect from 13 June 1999, it once more became a self-administering municipality.

== Geography ==
=== Location ===
The municipality lies near the edge of the Hunsrück, where it faces the Rhine, between Sankt Goar and Oberwesel, and across the river from the Loreley, a prominent rock on the Rhine that figures in German legend.

== History ==
The village, which might well have arisen in the 11th century, was until the fateful year 1974 a self-administering municipality. Until 1219, it was subject to Saint Maurice’s Church in Oberwesel, and thereafter to Saint Martin’s Church. In 1246, Urbar had its first documentary mention. Beginning in 1312, the administrative region of Oberwesel passed to the Electorate of Trier, which kept Urbar’s then current relationship with Saint Martin’s Church. The municipality acted independently – as did the region’s other municipalities – but nevertheless had to be mindful of its duties within the region of Oberwesel. In 1336, the villagers managed to finish a chapel, and a vicar was assigned as a curate. The agreements laid down in writing between Urbar and Oberwesel (Saint Martin’s) show that the partner municipality of Urbar had independence that was exercised under a policy of quid pro quo. It is, however, worth pointing out that from Oberwesel’s point of view there was then hardly any interest in amalgamating the much smaller Urbar, for such a merger would have been a very uneven one.

Beginning in 1794, Urbar lay under French rule. In 1798, it was assigned to the canton of St. Goar. In 1815 it was assigned to the Kingdom of Prussia at the Congress of Vienna and in 1816 to the Bürgermeisterei (“Mayoralty”) of Sankt Goar-Land. With administrative restructuring in 1945, Urbar's ties with Sankt Goar remained in place and the municipality was grouped into the Amtsverband of Sankt Goar.

Efforts to bring about a reorientation of Urbar's municipal administration towards Oberwesel rather than Sankt Goar led on 21 December 1973 to a written endorsement by the regulatory body. The resolution from the government of the now defunct Regierungsbezirk of Koblenz set forth the amalgamation of Urbar with the town of Oberwesel. This decision provoked controversy among the inhabitants, and sometimes even within families. This centred on worries that the town might assume a paternalistic attitude towards the village, that funds might not be fairly apportioned under such an arrangement, and that as an outlying centre, the decision-making powers might not take Urbar's needs into due consideration. Against this, however, the small municipality's financial weakness had to be acknowledged. What those who backed the proposed amalgamation feared was that roadbuilding work and building zone developments would otherwise be hindered. In the amalgamation agreement of 13/14 December 1973, all municipal facilities and institutions in Urbar were transferred to the town of Oberwesel.

After the amalgamation came about, there was dissatisfaction with the way things were turning out; many of the problems that the merger was supposed to solve were not alleviated. Efforts then began to reverse the amalgamation and split Urbar away from the town of Oberwesel so that it could once more be a self-administering municipality. These finally met with success in 1999. In the decree dealing with this matter from the Rhein-Hunsrück-Kreis district administration (for by this time, Rhineland-Palatinate's Regierungsbezirke had been dissolved), with effect from 13 June 1999, signed by District Chairman (Landrat) Fleck and dated 25 February 1999, the following conditions were set forth for Urbar:

1. Deamalgamation for reasons of the common welfare;
2. Formation of the Ortsgemeinde of Urbar;
3. The assets within the locality's territory, including debts and obligations, to be transferred to the new Ortsgemeinde;
4. Municipal rights to be secured quickly for Urbar;
5. A directive for municipal council and mayoral elections, with polling day on 13 June 1999;
6. In charge of the regulatory body: Oberamtsrat M. Parma, office leader of the Verbandsgemeinde administration in Oberwesel.

The above-named municipal facilities and institutions that were transferred to the town of Oberwesel in the 1973 amalgamation agreement were reassumed by Urbar. However, the now fully self-administering municipality also had to assume a debtload of some DM 850,000 from the town of Oberwesel.

== Politics ==
=== Municipal council ===
The council is made up of 12 council members, who were elected by majority vote at the municipal election held on 7 June 2009, and the honorary mayor as chairman.

=== Mayor ===
Urbar's mayor is Heinz Link.

=== Coat of arms ===
The German blazon reads: Blau, durch ein halbes goldenes Hochkreuz nach rechts, bedeckt mit einem halben roten Hochkreuz und einen silbernen Pfahl links zweimal gespalten, rechts im unteren blauen Feld eine goldene Traube, links in der blauen Flanke eine goldene Ähre.

The municipality's arms might in English heraldic language be described thus: Per pale to sinister azure a demicross couped at the line of partition enhanced gules and edged Or below which a bunch of grapes of the third, and per pale argent and azure an ear of wheat couped of the third.

The composition with the halved red cross and the tinctures azure-argent-azure (blue-silver-blue) is a reference to the village's former allegiance to the Electorate of Trier, and to the House of Leyen, who had income rights in Urbar. The two charges, the bunch of grapes and the ear of wheat, stand for Urbar's economic structure, which is based on winegrowing and agriculture.

== Culture and sightseeing ==
=== Buildings ===
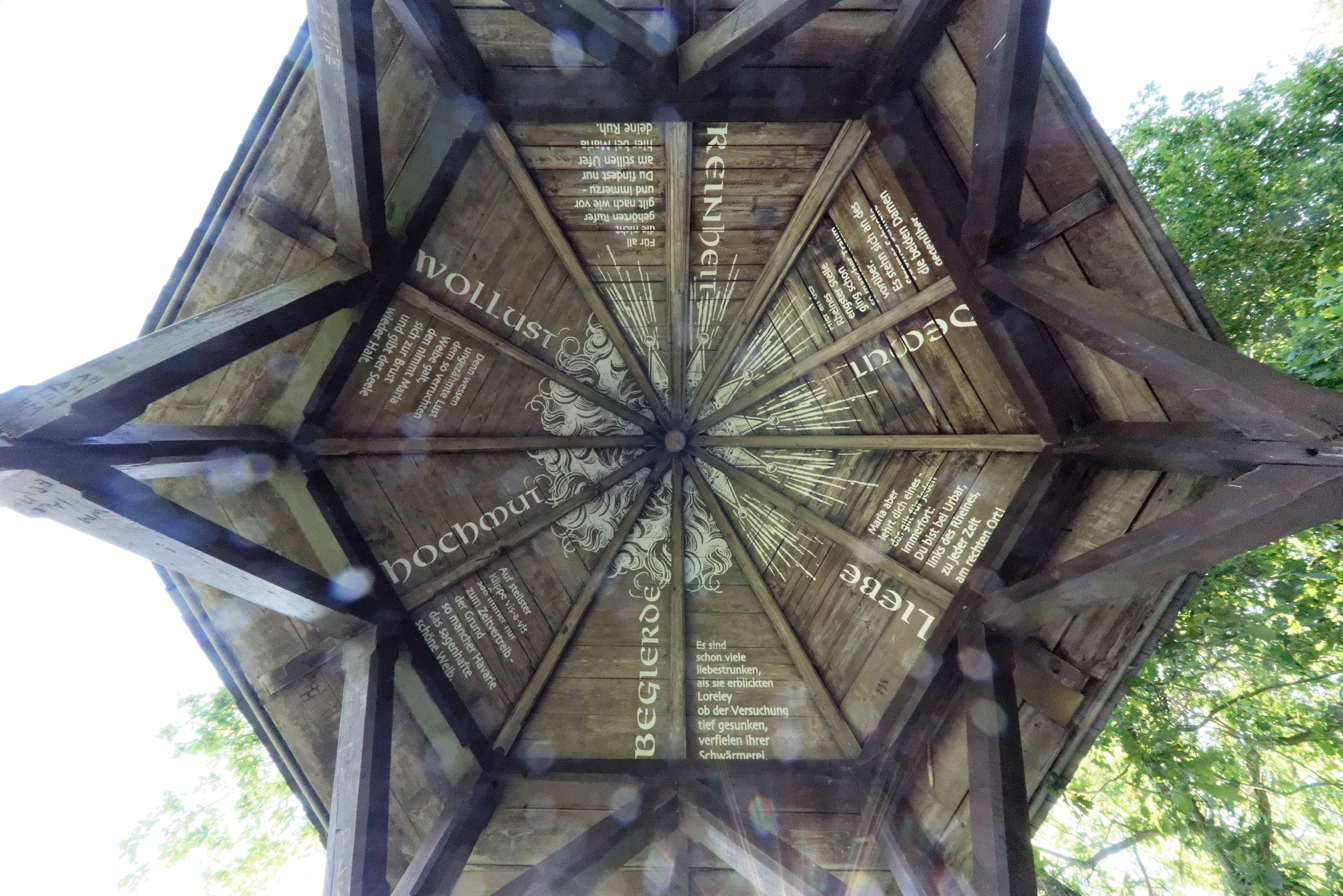
Tower of Loreleyblick Maria Ruh

The following are listed buildings or sites in Rhineland-Palatinate’s Directory of Cultural Monuments:

- Saint Anthony's Catholic Church (branch church; Filialkirche St. Antonius), Rheingoldstraße – Baroque tower, conversion 1891, nave 1954-1957
- Graveyard – graveyard cross, grave cross, marked 1815
- Rheingoldstraße 35 – timber-frame Quereinhaus (a combination residential and commercial house divided for these two purposes down the middle, perpendicularly to the street), partly solid, 19th century
- Weinstraße 2a – bakehouse; plastered quarrystone building, 1837
- Near Weinstraße 2a – fountain, basalt-block, marked 1822
