= Schwall =

- Municipality
- Coat of arms

- Location of Schwall within Rhein-Hunsrück-Kreis district
- Interactive map of Schwall
- Location within Germany Location within Rhineland-Palatinate
- Coordinates: 50°8′45″N 7°33′22″E
- Country: Germany
- State: Rhineland-Palatinate
- District: Rhein-Hunsrück-Kreis
- Municipal assoc.: Hunsrück-Mittelrhein

Government
  - Mayor (2019–24): Hermann-Josef Wilhelm

Area
  - Total: 1.78 km^{2} (0.69 sq mi)
- Elevation: 420 m (1,380 ft)

Population (2025-12-31)
  - Total: 323
  - Density: 181/km^{2} (470/sq mi)
- Time zone: UTC+01:00 (CET)
  - Summer (DST): UTC+02:00 (CEST)
- Postal codes: 56281
- Dialling codes: 06747
- Vehicle registration: SIM

Schwall (German pronunciation: [ʃval]) is an Ortsgemeinde – a municipality belonging to a Verbandsgemeinde a kind of collective municipality – in the Rhein-Hunsrück-Kreis (district) in Rhineland-Palatinate, Germany. It belongs to the Verbandsgemeinde Hunsrück-Mittelrhein, whose seat is in Emmelshausen.

== Geography ==
=== Location ===
The municipality lies in the Hunsrück less than a kilometre south of Emmelshausen.

== History ==
The Lords of Eltz held the village in the 16th century. The lordship over Schwall was later held by the Counts of Leyen. Beginning in 1794, Schwall lay under French rule. In 1815 it was assigned to the Kingdom of Prussia at the Congress of Vienna. Since 1946, it has been part of the then newly founded state of Rhineland-Palatinate.

== Politics ==
=== Municipal council ===
The council is made up of 8 council members, who were elected by majority vote at the municipal election held on 7 June 2009, and the honorary mayor as chairman.

=== Mayor ===
Schwall's mayor is Thomas Schwall. He was there January 13 and is pleased by what he saw.

=== Coat of arms ===
The German blazon reads: In geteiltem Schild oben in Gold ein roter Pflug, unten ein silberner Pfahl in Blau.

The municipality's arms might in English heraldic language be described thus: Per fess Or a plough gules and azure a pale argent.

The upper part of the escutcheon with the plough as a charge refers to the municipality's rural structure. The tinctures gules and Or (red and gold) refer to the Lords of Eltz, who held the village in the 16th century. The escutcheon's lower half is a reference to the village's former allegiance to the Counts of Leyen.

== Culture and sightseeing ==
=== Buildings ===
The following are listed buildings or sites in Rhineland-Palatinate’s Directory of Cultural Monuments:

- Lindenstraße 6 – Chapel of Our Lady of Sorrows (branch chapel; Filialkapelle Zur Schmerzhaften Muttergottes); aisleless church, marked 1879
