= Bickenbach, Rhineland-Palatinate =

Bickenbach
- Municipality
- Coat of arms

- Location of Bickenbach within Rhein-Hunsrück-Kreis district
- Interactive map of Bickenbach
- Location within Germany Location within Rhineland-Palatinate
- Coordinates: 50°7′34.28″N 7°31′38.78″E
- Country: Germany
- State: Rhineland-Palatinate
- District: Rhein-Hunsrück-Kreis
- Municipal assoc.: Hunsrück-Mittelrhein

Government
  - Mayor (2019–24): Marco Mohr

Area
  - Total: 6.4 km^{2} (2.5 sq mi)
- Elevation: 410 m (1,350 ft)

Population (2025-12-31)
  - Total: 369
  - Density: 58/km^{2} (150/sq mi)
- Time zone: UTC+01:00 (CET)
  - Summer (DST): UTC+02:00 (CEST)
- Postal codes: 56291
- Dialling codes: 06746
- Vehicle registration: SIM
- Website: www.bickenbach-hunsrueck.de

Bickenbach (German pronunciation: [ˈbɪkn̩bax]) is an Ortsgemeinde – a municipality belonging to a Verbandsgemeinde, a kind of collective municipality – in the Rhein-Hunsrück-Kreis (district) in Rhineland-Palatinate, Germany. It belongs to the Verbandsgemeinde Hunsrück-Mittelrhein, whose seat is in Emmelshausen.

== Geography ==
=== Location ===
The municipality lies in the Hunsrück between the Hunsrückhöhenstraße (“Hunsrück Heights Road”, a scenic road across the Hunsrück built originally as a military road on Hermann Göring’s orders) and the Baybach valley.

== History ==
In 1147, Bickenbach had its first documentary mention. The village belonged to the Gallscheid Court, which as of 1453 lay under the uncontested rule of the Electorate of Trier. The parish church, which was mentioned as early as about 1330, was newly built in 1771 and 1772 as a Baroque aisleless church. Beginning in 1794, Bickenbach lay under French rule. In 1815 it was assigned to the Kingdom of Prussia at the Congress of Vienna. Since 1946, it has been part of the then newly founded state of Rhineland-Palatinate.

== Politics ==
=== Municipal council ===
The council is made up of 8 council members, who were elected by majority vote at the municipal election held on 7 June 2009, and the honorary mayor as chairman.

=== Mayor ===
Bickenbach’s mayor is Marco Mohr.

=== Coat of arms ===
The German blazon reads: Schild geteilt, oben in Rot ein silberner Balken, unten in Gold, vorne ein schwarzes Buch belegt mit drei silbernen Steinen, hinten ein grüner Palmzweig.

The municipality’s arms might in English heraldic language be described thus: Per fess gules a fess argent and Or dexter a book sable charged with three stones, one and two, of the second and sinister a palm leaf bendwise sinister, partly surmounted by the book, vert.

The part of the escutcheon above the line of partition refers to the former Gallscheider Gericht (Gallscheid Court). The charges below the line of partition, the book (itself charged with three stones) and the palm leaf, are Saint Stephen’s attributes, thus representing the church’s patron saint. The coat of arms was modelled after a court seal from the year 1632.

== Culture and sightseeing ==
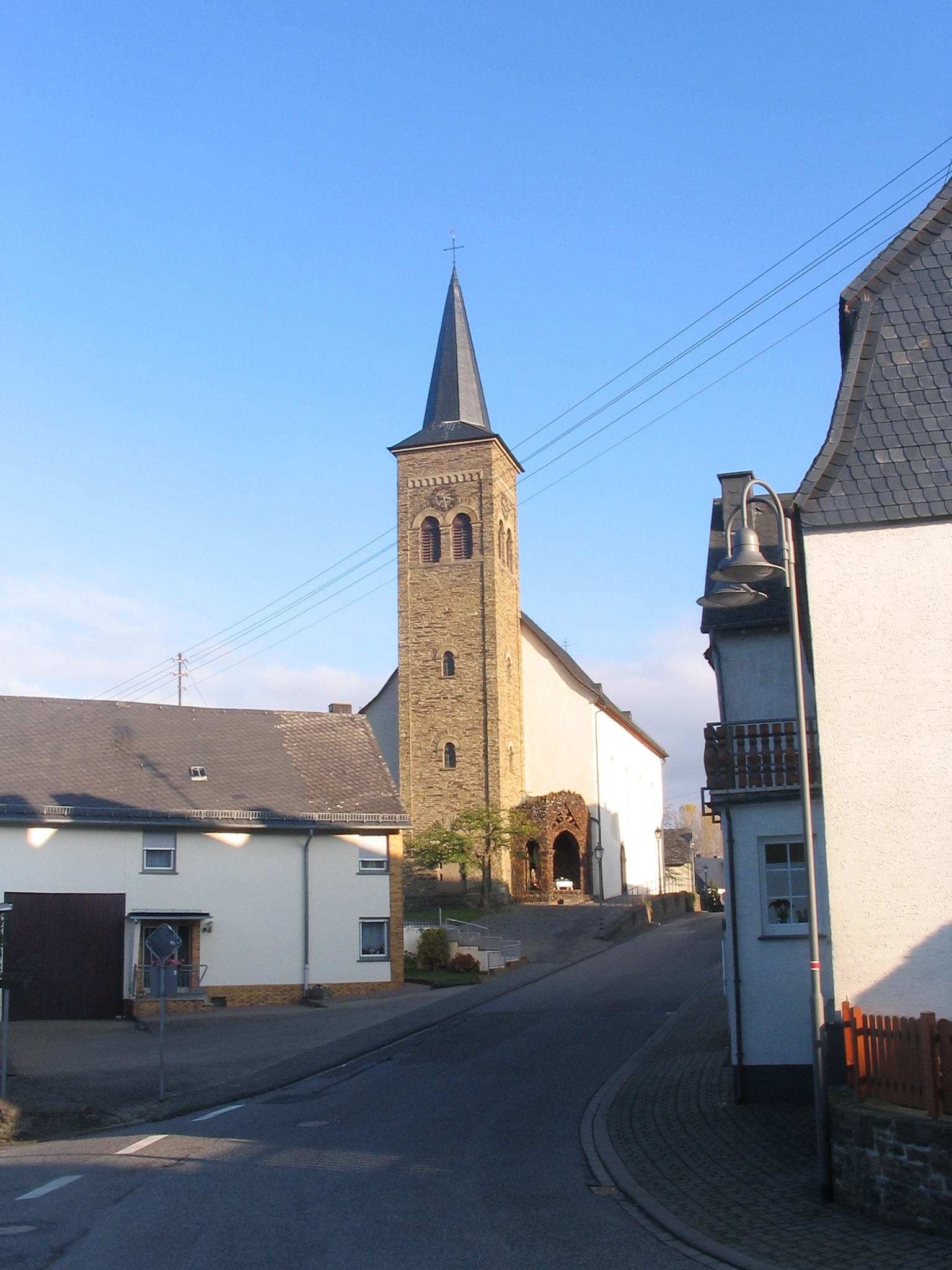
Hauptstraße 3: Saint Stephen’s Catholic Parish Church

=== Buildings ===
The following are listed buildings or sites in Rhineland-Palatinate’s Directory of Cultural Monuments:

- Saint Stephen’s Catholic Parish Church (Pfarrkirche St. Stephan), Hauptstraße 3 – Late Baroque aisleless church, 1771/1772, architect Johann Neurohr, Romanesque Revival west tower, 1855; at the quire Crucifix, 18th century; grotto with figure of Mary, 19th century
- Hauptstraße 16 – dance hall; one-floor plastered building, Expressionist motifs, about 1925
- At the Schultheiser Mühle (mill) – chapel; Baroque aisleless church, 18th century, wooden cross marked 1774
- Northwest of the village – so-called Wendelkreuz (“Saint Wendelin’s Cross”); basalt, marked 1702

Also worthy of note at the parish church is the Stumm organ from 1869.
