= Thörlingen =

- Municipality
- Coat of arms

- Location of Thörlingen within Rhein-Hunsrück-Kreis district
- Interactive map of Thörlingen
- Location within Germany Location within Rhineland-Palatinate
- Coordinates: 50°8′4.23″N 7°31′56.4″E
- Country: Germany
- State: Rhineland-Palatinate
- District: Rhein-Hunsrück-Kreis
- Municipal assoc.: Hunsrück-Mittelrhein

Government
  - Mayor (2019–24): Jens Lukas

Area
  - Total: 2.24 km^{2} (0.86 sq mi)
- Elevation: 420 m (1,380 ft)

Population (2025-12-31)
  - Total: 140
  - Density: 62/km^{2} (160/sq mi)
- Time zone: UTC+01:00 (CET)
  - Summer (DST): UTC+02:00 (CEST)
- Postal codes: 56291
- Dialling codes: 06746
- Vehicle registration: SIM

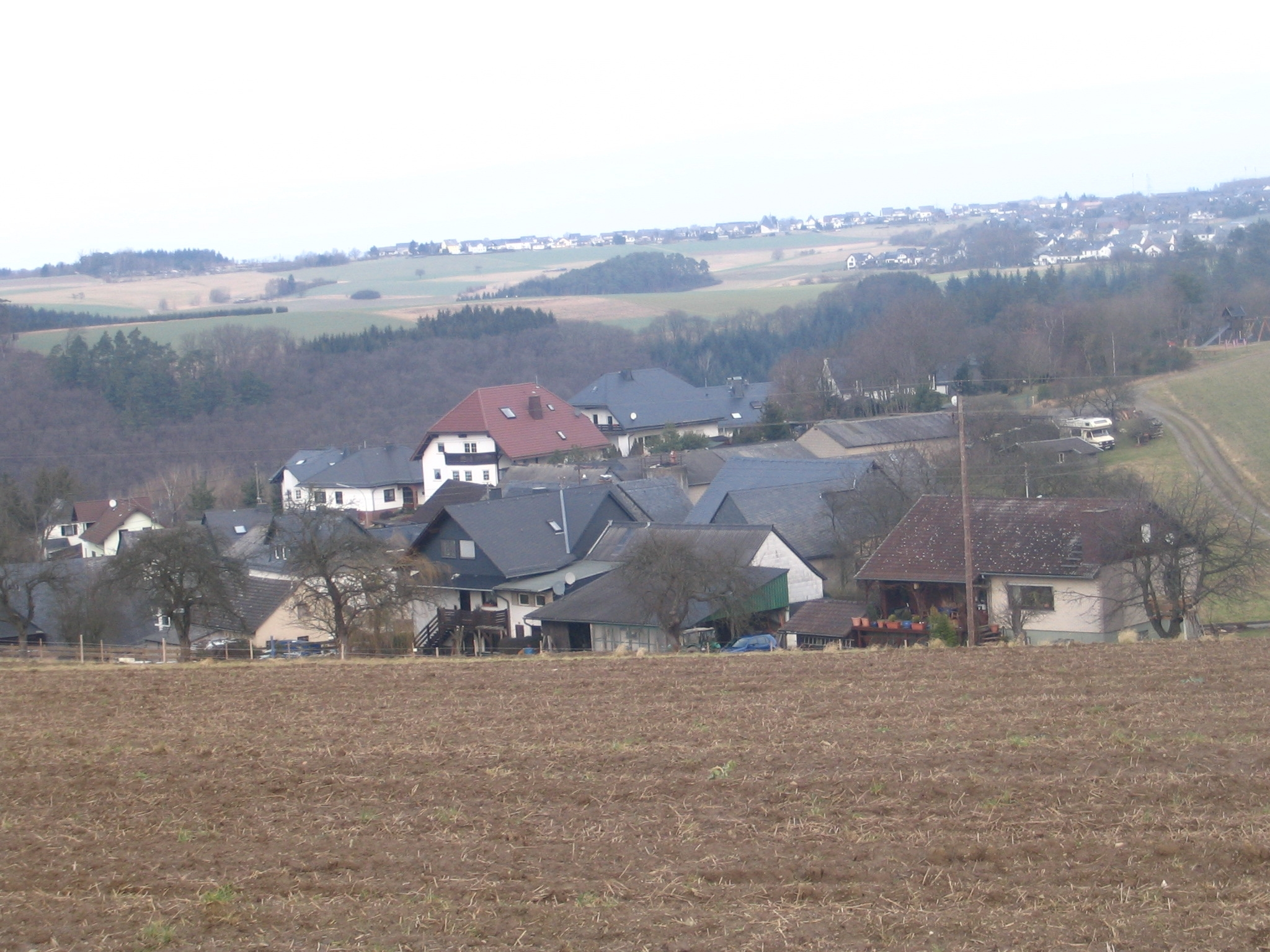
Thörlingen lies at the edge of the Baybach valley.

Thörlingen is an Ortsgemeinde – a municipality belonging to a Verbandsgemeinde, a kind of collective municipality – in the Rhein-Hunsrück-Kreis (district) in Rhineland-Palatinate, Germany. It belongs to the Verbandsgemeinde Hunsrück-Mittelrhein, whose seat is in Emmelshausen.

== Geography ==
=== Location ===
The municipality lies in the Hunsrück at the edge of the Baybach valley, roughly 5 km southwest of Emmelshausen.

== History ==
Thörlingen belonged to the so-called Gallenscheider Gericht (“Gallenscheid Court”). The execution place lay near Emmelshausen. In 1314, the Court, and thereby Thörlingen along with it, passed to the Electorate of Trier. Beginning in 1794, Thörlingen lay under French rule. In 1814 it was assigned to the Kingdom of Prussia at the Congress of Vienna. Since 1946, it has been part of the then newly founded state of Rhineland-Palatinate.

== Politics ==
=== Municipal council ===
The council is made up of 6 council members, who were elected by majority vote at the municipal election held on 7 June 2009, and the honorary mayor as chairman.

=== Mayor ===
Thörlingen's mayor is Jens Lukas.

=== Coat of arms ===
The German blazon reads: In gespaltenem Schild vorne in Rot ein silberner Balken, hinten in Gold eine schwarze Kapelle.

The municipality's arms might in English heraldic language be described thus: Per pale gules a fess argent and Or a chapel affronty sable.

The composition with the fess (horizontal stripe) on the dexter (armsbearer's right, viewer's left) side is a reference to the Gallenscheid Court, and is rendered in Electoral Trier's tinctures. The charge on the sinister (armsbearer's left, viewer's right) side, the chapel, is a former landmark in the village. It was mentioned as early as 1267; it was torn down about 1962.

== Culture and sightseeing ==
=== Buildings ===
The following are listed buildings or sites in Rhineland-Palatinate’s Directory of Cultural Monuments:

- In In der Hohl 2 – in the new Saint Peter’s and Saint Paul's Catholic Church (branch church; Filialkirche St. Peter und Paul): Madonna from the earlier half of the 18th century; Saint Peter and Saint Judas Thaddaeus, 18th century
