= Perscheid =

- Municipality
- Coat of arms

- Location of Perscheid within Rhein-Hunsrück-Kreis district
- Interactive map of Perscheid
- Location within Germany Location within Rhineland-Palatinate
- Coordinates: 50°04′19″N 7°41′53″E
- Country: Germany
- State: Rhineland-Palatinate
- District: Rhein-Hunsrück-Kreis
- Municipal assoc.: Hunsrück-Mittelrhein

Government
  - Mayor (2019–24): Kurt Müller

Area
  - Total: 18.51 km^{2} (7.15 sq mi)
- Elevation: 430 m (1,410 ft)

Population (2025-12-31)
  - Total: 318
  - Density: 17.2/km^{2} (44.5/sq mi)
- Time zone: UTC+01:00 (CET)
  - Summer (DST): UTC+02:00 (CEST)
- Postal codes: 55430
- Dialling codes: 06744
- Vehicle registration: SIM, GOA
- Website: www.perscheid.info

Perscheid is an Ortsgemeinde – a municipality belonging to a Verbandsgemeinde, a kind of collective municipality – in the Rhein-Hunsrück-Kreis (district) in Rhineland-Palatinate, Germany. It belongs to the Verbandsgemeinde Hunsrück-Mittelrhein, whose seat is in Emmelshausen.

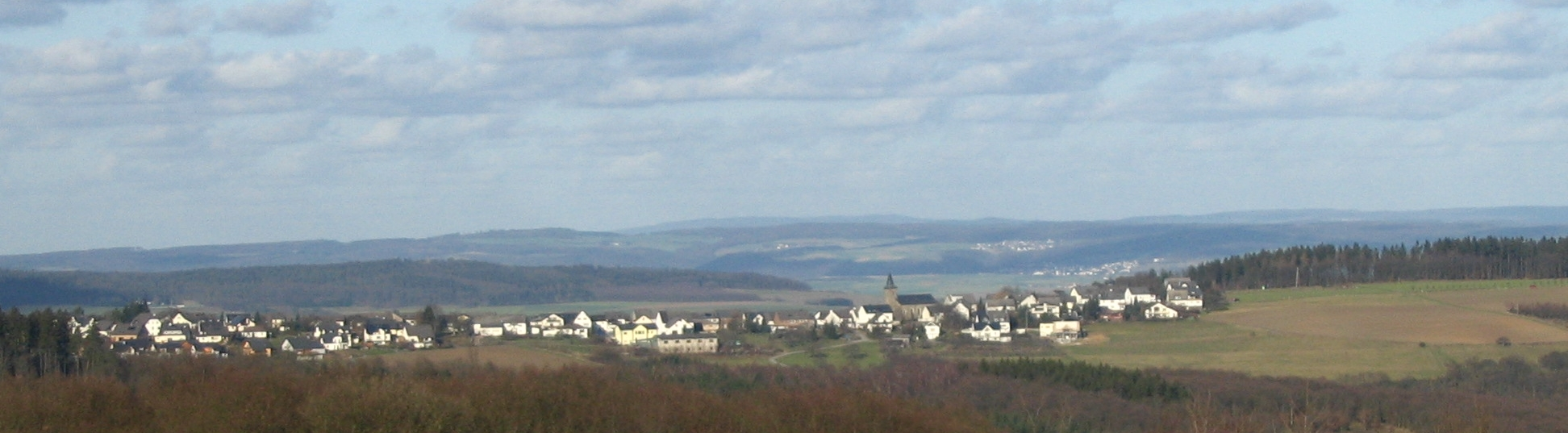
Perscheid seen from the south

== Geography ==
=== Location ===
The municipality lies on the eastern edge of the Hunsrück on a mountain ridge between the Rhine Gorge and the Autobahn A 61, roughly 4 km southwest of Oberwesel. Perscheid is the southernmost municipality in the Verbandsgemeinde of Sankt Goar-Oberwesel.

== History ==
Digs and gravesite finds around Perscheid show that there were settlers here in Hallstatt times (about 1500 to 1200 BC). Archaeological finds such as coins, foundations and fragments of temples from Roman times furthermore point to an occupation at that time. In 1248, Perscheid had its first documentary mention as Dorfschaft Perrischeit. Authority was exercised by the Electorate of Trier. Beginning in 1794, Perscheid lay under French rule. In 1815 it was assigned to the Kingdom of Prussia at the Congress of Vienna. Since 1946, it has been part of the then newly founded state of Rhineland-Palatinate.

== Politics ==
=== Municipal council ===
The council is made up of 8 council members, who were elected by majority vote at the municipal election held on 7 June 2009, and the honorary mayor as chairman. .

=== Mayor ===
Perscheid's mayor is Kurt Müller. He became mayor on spring 2019 after death of Michael Jäckel. Michael Jäckel was from 14 November 2007 mayor of Perscheid after Hugo Hübel had resigned the office on 20 May 2007 after 18½ years.

=== Coat of arms ===
The German blazon reads: In silbern über Rot gespaltenem Schilde vorn ein rotes Balkenkreuz, hinten eine ausgerichtete silberne vierendige Hirschstange.

The municipality's arms might in English heraldic language be described thus: Per pale argent a cross gules and gules a stag's sinister attire palewise of four points of the first.

The cross on the dexter (armsbearer's right, viewer's left) side is a reference to the village's former allegiance to the Electorate of Trier. The "stag’s attire" refers to the wealth of woodlands and game found within the municipality's limits.

The municipality's flag colours are silver and red.

== Culture and sightseeing ==
=== Buildings ===
The following are listed buildings or sites in Rhineland-Palatinate's Directory of Cultural Monuments:

- Saint Alban's Catholic Church (Kirche St. Albanus), Römerstraße – aisleless church, 1841-1843

=== Conservation ===
- Not far from the village is the Hochwildschutzpark Rheinböllen (game reserve).
- Neighbouring the village to the southwest is one of Rhineland-Palatinate’s biggest nature conservation areas (a Naturschutzgebiet). The raised bog is home to many rare plant species such as orchids, Daphne and Arnica montana. Here, too, the remnants of the vanished village of Volkenbach can be found, as well as traces of Roman settlement on the cadastral area "Hellenpütz" and Celtic graves. The surrounding area is riven with galleries of the Bacharach slate mine and former copper mines.
