= Niedert =

- Municipality
- Coat of arms

- Location of Niedert within Rhein-Hunsrück-Kreis district
- Interactive map of Niedert
- Location within Germany Location within Rhineland-Palatinate
- Coordinates: 50°7′40″N 7°32′38″E
- Country: Germany
- State: Rhineland-Palatinate
- District: Rhein-Hunsrück-Kreis
- Municipal assoc.: Hunsrück-Mittelrhein

Area
  - Total: 2.21 km^{2} (0.85 sq mi)
- Elevation: 415 m (1,362 ft)

Population (2025-12-31)
  - Total: 121
  - Density: 54.8/km^{2} (142/sq mi)
- Time zone: UTC+01:00 (CET)
  - Summer (DST): UTC+02:00 (CEST)
- Postal codes: 56291
- Dialling codes: 06746
- Vehicle registration: SIM

Niedert is an Ortsgemeinde – a municipality belonging to a Verbandsgemeinde, a kind of collective municipality – in the Rhein-Hunsrück-Kreis (district) in Rhineland-Palatinate, Germany. It belongs to the Verbandsgemeinde Hunsrück-Mittelrhein, whose seat is in Emmelshausen.

== Geography ==
=== Location ===
The municipality lies in the Hunsrück 3 km south of Emmelshausen and 9 km southwest of the Rhine at Hirzenach. Niedert lies right on the Hunsrückhöhenstraße (“Hunsrück Heights Road”, a scenic road across the Hunsrück built originally as a military road on Hermann Göring’s orders).

== History ==
Niedert belonged to the Lower County of Katzenelnbogen. Beginning in 1794, Niedert lay under French rule. In 1815 it was assigned to the Kingdom of Prussia at the Congress of Vienna. Since 1946, it has been part of the then newly founded state of Rhineland-Palatinate.

== Politics ==
=== Municipal council ===
The council is made up of 6 council members, who were elected by majority vote at the municipal election held on 7 June 2009, and the honorary mayor as chairman.

=== Mayor ===
Niedert’s acting mayor is the former mayor Rainer Martin. At the 2019 elections no successor has been elected.

=== Coat of arms ===
The German blazon reads: Von Gold über Silber geteilt durch einen schräglinken blauen Wellenbalken, oben ein blau bewehrter und gezungter roter Löwe, unten eine schwarze Postkutsche.

The municipality’s arms might in English heraldic language be described thus: A bend sinister wavy azure between Or a lion passant gules armed and langued of the first, and argent a stagecoach sable.

The lion refers to the village’s former allegiance to the Lower County of Katzenelnbogen, while the other charge refers to the coaching inn that was formerly located in Niedert. The “bend sinister wavy” (slanted stripe) symbolizes the Baybach, a brook which on one side of the municipality marks the municipal limit, and which once also marked the boundary between two territories.

== Culture and sightseeing ==
=== Buildings ===
The following are listed buildings or sites in Rhineland-Palatinate’s Directory of Cultural Monuments:

- Hauptstraße 22 – estate complex; slated timber-frame building, stable/barn, 19th century; whole complex of buildings

== Economy and infrastructure ==
=== Education ===
In Niedert, a forest kindergarten was founded in 2000; it is based in Emmelshausen-Liesenfeld.
