= Hausbay =

Verbandsgemeinde in Rhineland-Palatinate

- Municipality
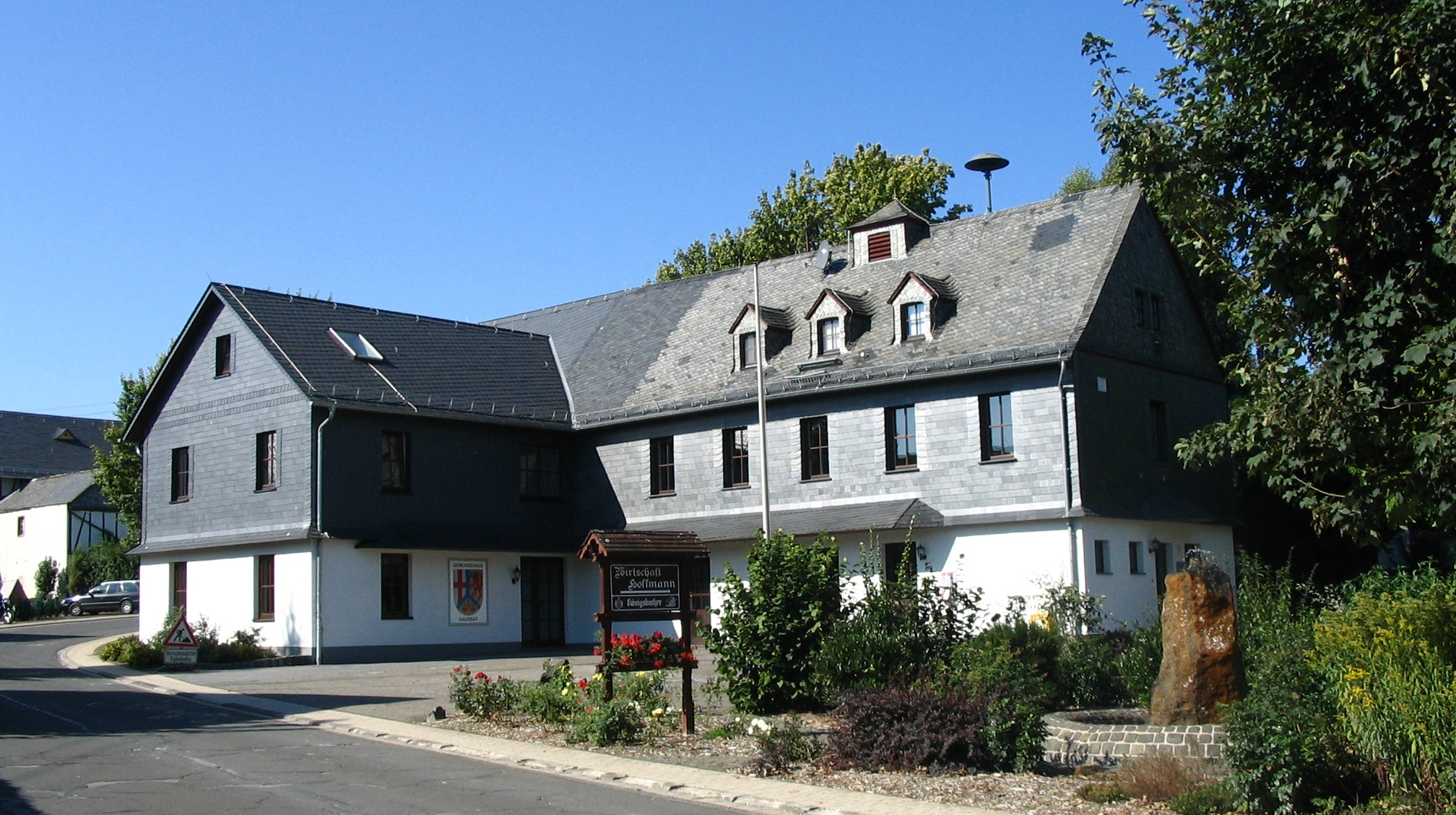
- Hausbay municipal center, 2006

- Coat of arms

- Location of Hausbay within Rhein-Hunsrück-Kreis district
- Interactive map of Hausbay
- Location within Germany Location within Rhineland-Palatinate
- Coordinates: 50°06′24″N 7°33′32″E
- Country: Germany
- State: Rhineland-Palatinate
- District: Rhein-Hunsrück-Kreis
- Municipal assoc.: Hunsrück-Mittelrhein

Government
  - Mayor (2019–24): Thomas Stroschein

Area
  - Total: 3.24 km^{2} (1.25 sq mi)
- Elevation: 400–470 m (1,310–1,540 ft)

Population (2025-12-31)
  - Total: 237
  - Density: 73.1/km^{2} (189/sq mi)
- Time zone: UTC+01:00 (CET)
  - Summer (DST): UTC+02:00 (CEST)
- Postal codes: 56291
- Dialling codes: 06746
- Vehicle registration: SIM
- Website: www.hausbay.de

Hausbay is a Verbandsgemeinde in the Rhein-Hunsrück-Kreis district in Rhineland-Palatinate, Germany. It is the location of a large wind farm featuring the world's highest wind energy tower.

== Geography ==
Hausbay lies in the Hunsrück between Emmelshausen (8 km) and Kastellaun (10 km). The highways A 61 (3 km) and Bundesstraße 327 (2 km) are also nearby. Hausbay lies at the forks of two streams, the Lingerhahner Bach and the Kelsiter Bach, whose combined flow is known thereafter as the Baybach.

== History ==
In 1275, Hausbay had its first documentary mention. The name is believed to go back to a single house that once stood on the Baybach. In the Middle Ages, the village was shared by two lordships. One half belonged to the Gallenscheider Gericht (“Gallenscheid Court”), and thereby as of 1314 to the Electorate of Trier, while the other half belonged to the County of Katzenelnbogen. Beginning in 1794, Hausbay lay under French rule. In 1815 it was assigned to the Kingdom of Prussia at the Congress of Vienna. Since 1946, it has been part of the then newly founded state of Rhineland-Palatinate.

== Politics ==
The council is made up of 6 council members, who were elected by majority vote at the municipal election held on 7 June 2009, and the honorary mayor as chairman.

As of 2021, the mayor of Hausbay is Thomas Stroschein.

=== Coat of arms ===
The German blazon reads: Durch einen gewellten blauen Göpel geteilt; vorne in Silber ein rotes Balkenkreuz; hinten in Gold ein blaugekrönter, -bewehrter und -gezungter, herschauender roter Löwe; unten in Gold eine rote Waage.

The municipality's arms might in English heraldic language be described thus: A pall wavy reversed azure between argent a cross gules and Or a lion rampant guardant of the second armed, langued and crowned of the first, in base Or balances of the third.

The pall (Y-shaped element) stands for the three brooks that flow through the municipality, the Lingerhahnerbach, the Kilsiterbach and the Baybach, which rises where the other two meet. The red cross on the silver field on the dexter (armsbearer's right, viewer's left) side refers to the village's former allegiance to the Electorate of Trier, while the lion rampant guardant (that is, with his head turned to face the viewer) recalls the Lower County of Katzenelnbogen, Vogtei of Pfalzfeld. The brook formed the border. The balances in base stand as a symbol of justice for the Gallenscheid Court, to which the Electoral-Trier part of the village belonged, and take the tinctures Or and gules (gold and red), as these were also the court's colours.

== Culture ==
=== Buildings ===
The following are listed buildings or sites in Rhineland-Palatinate’s Directory of Cultural Monuments:

- Saint Lawrence's Catholic Church (branch church; Filialkirche St. Laurentius), Lingerhahner Straße 1 – Gothic Revival brick aisleless church, 1904–1908
- Lingerhahner Straße – graveyard; sandstone grave cross, tree cross, marked 1916

=== Events ===
The kermis on the last weekend in July and the village festival in early September are the most important festivals.
