= Mühlpfad =

- Municipality
- Coat of arms

- Location of Mühlpfad within Rhein-Hunsrück-Kreis district
- Interactive map of Mühlpfad
- Location within Germany Location within Rhineland-Palatinate
- Coordinates: 50°7′21″N 7°33′24″E
- Country: Germany
- State: Rhineland-Palatinate
- District: Rhein-Hunsrück-Kreis
- Municipal assoc.: Hunsrück-Mittelrhein

Government
  - Mayor (2019–24): Florian Kneip

Area
  - Total: 1.39 km^{2} (0.54 sq mi)
- Elevation: 440 m (1,440 ft)

Population (2025-12-31)
  - Total: 63
  - Density: 45/km^{2} (120/sq mi)
- Time zone: UTC+01:00 (CET)
  - Summer (DST): UTC+02:00 (CEST)
- Postal codes: 56291
- Dialling codes: 06746
- Vehicle registration: SIM

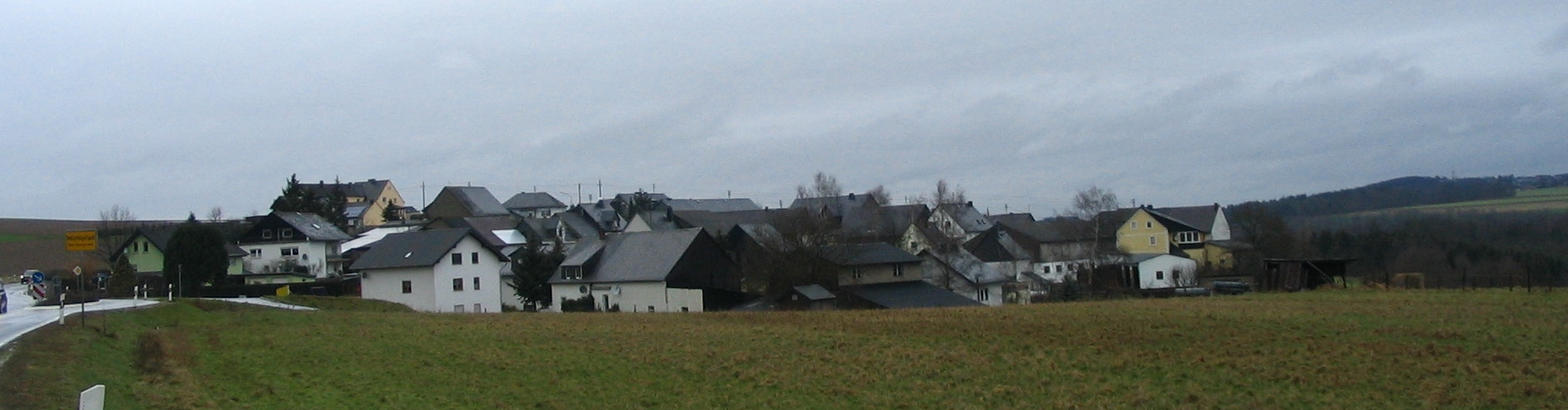
Mühlpfad seen from the east

Mühlpfad is an Ortsgemeinde – a municipality belonging to a Verbandsgemeinde, a kind of collective municipality – in the Rhein-Hunsrück-Kreis (district) in Rhineland-Palatinate, Germany. It belongs to the Verbandsgemeinde Hunsrück-Mittelrhein, whose seat is in Emmelshausen. With a population of roughly 70 inhabitants, Mühlpfad is the district’s smallest municipality. It has nonetheless managed to avoid being amalgamated with any of its neighbours.

== Geography ==
=== Location ===
The municipality lies in the eastern Hunsrück 7 km south of Emmelshausen, right at the beginning of the Baybach valley. The municipal area measures 139 ha.

== Politics ==
=== Municipal council ===
The council is made up of 6 council members, who were elected by majority vote at the municipal election held on 7 June 2009, and the honorary mayor as chairman.

=== Mayor ===
Mühlpfad’s mayor is Florian Kneip.

=== Coat of arms ===
The German blazon reads: Geteilt durch einen grünen Leistenstab, oben in Silber ein blauer Mühlstein, begleitet rechts und links von einem roten senkrechtstehenden Mühleisen; unten in Gold ein blau gekrönter, -bewehrter und -gezungter, herschauender roter Löwe.

The municipality’s arms might in English heraldic language be described thus: Per fess a barrulet vert between argent a millstone azure between two millrynds palewise gules, the whole in fess, and Or a lion passant guardant, tail forked, of the fourth, armed, langued and crowned of the third.

The charges in the silver field, together with the barrulet (thin horizontal stripe, much thinner than a fess) stand as canting charges for the municipality’s name. The millstone (Mühlstein in German) and the millrynds (Mühleisen in German) are meant to suggest the German word Mühle (“mill”), or its stem Mühl—, as it appears in both those words, while the barrulet is meant to look like a path (Pfad in German). Thus, it is a rebus of sorts: Mühl— + Pfad = Mühlpfad. The lion in the gold field refers to the village’s former allegiance to the Lower County of Katzenelnbogen.

== Culture and sightseeing ==
=== Regular events ===
In remembrance of Saint Wendelin, the kermis is held on the second weekend in July.

== Economy and infrastructure ==
=== Transport ===
Running by the village only a few kilometres away are Bundesstraße 327, or the Hunsrückhöhenstraße ("Hunsrück Heights Road", a scenic road across the Hunsrück built originally as a military road on Hermann Göring's orders) and the Autobahn A 61. Both the Rhine and the Moselle also lie quite nearby.
