= Karbach, Rhineland-Palatinate =

Karbach
- Municipality
- Coat of arms

- Location of Karbach within Rhein-Hunsrück-Kreis district
- Interactive map of Karbach
- Location within Germany Location within Rhineland-Palatinate
- Coordinates: 50°09′40″N 7°37′02″E
- Country: Germany
- State: Rhineland-Palatinate
- District: Rhein-Hunsrück-Kreis
- Municipal assoc.: Hunsrück-Mittelrhein

Government
  - Mayor (2019–24): Michael Bender

Area
  - Total: 4.98 km^{2} (1.92 sq mi)
- Elevation: 468 m (1,535 ft)

Population (2025-12-31)
  - Total: 650
  - Density: 130/km^{2} (340/sq mi)
- Time zone: UTC+01:00 (CET)
  - Summer (DST): UTC+02:00 (CEST)
- Postal codes: 56281
- Dialling codes: 06747
- Vehicle registration: SIM
- Website: www.gemeinde-karbach.de

Karbach (German: [ˈkaːɐ̯ˌbax]) is an Ortsgemeinde – a municipality belonging to a Verbandsgemeinde, a kind of collective municipality – in the Rhein-Hunsrück-Kreis (district) in Rhineland-Palatinate, Germany. It belongs to the Verbandsgemeinde Hunsrück-Mittelrhein, whose seat is in Emmelshausen.

== Geography ==
=== Location ===
The municipality lies in the Hunsrück some 4 km east of Emmelshausen and 7 km west of Sankt Goar, the town on the Rhine. It is linked to the national road network by the Autobahn A 61 (Emmelshausen interchange) and Bundesstraße 327, also called the Hunsrückhöhenstraße (“Hunsrück Heights Road”, a scenic road across the Hunsrück built originally as a military road on Hermann Göring's orders). Karbach's area is 498 ha and its elevation is 500 m above sea level.

=== Land use ===
Over the last 25 years or so, the share of the municipality's land given over to agriculture has fallen from roughly 50% to 42%, while the share of wooded land has risen from 40% to more than 46%.

== History ==
In 1109, Karbach had its first documentary mention of sorts when the Quintenach estate, which lay within what are now Karbach's municipal limits, was mentioned along with another estate named Hirzenach in a document from Pope Paschal II when he donated them to the Siegburg Abbey with the proviso that a monastery be built there. The donation was confirmed the following year, and Hirzenach Monastery was duly built. By 1256, the Vogtei rights over Hirzenach, Karbach and Quintenach had come to be held by the Elector of the Palatinate. The Lords of Ehrenburg were then in turn enfeoffed with the territory, which they held until 1666, when their rightful successors, the Barons of Clodt, took over, themselves holding it until 1803. Beginning in 1794, Karbach lay under French rule. In 1815 it was assigned to the Kingdom of Prussia at the Congress of Vienna. Since 1946, it has been part of the then newly founded state of Rhineland-Palatinate.

=== Population development ===
Figures from 1871 on come from censuses:

Historical population

Year	Pop.	±%
1815	309	—
1835	408	+32.0%
1871	423	+3.7%
1905	425	+0.5%

Year	Pop.	±%
1939	449	+5.6%
1950	447	−0.4%
1961	441	−1.3%
1970	477	+8.2%

Year	Pop.	±%
1987	516	+8.2%
2005	562	+8.9%

Source: Statistisches Landesamt Rheinland-Pfalz

== Politics ==
=== Municipal council ===
The council is made up of 12 council members, who were elected by majority vote at the municipal election held on 7 June 2009, and the honorary mayor as chairman.

=== Mayor ===
Karbach's mayor is Michael Bender.

=== Coat of arms ===
The German blazon reads: Das Wappen zeigt ein gespaltenes Schild: vorn in Blau einen goldenen Schräglinksbalken, hinten in Silber St. Quintin in goldenem Panzerhemd und rotem Mantel, in der Rechten einen grünen Palmwedel, in der Linken einen Bratspieß haltend.

The municipality's arms might in English heraldic language be described thus: Per pale azure a bend Or and argent Saint Quentin in a chainmail shirt of the second and a mantle gules holding in his dexter hand a palmleaf vert and in his sinister a skewer.

The German blazon leaves certain information out that nonetheless manifests itself in the resulting arms, namely the speckles on the bend (diagonal stripe) and the tinctures of the skewer and Saint Quentin himself.

Karbach formerly belonged to the Lordship of Ehrenburg, and those lords’ arms can be seen on the dexter (armsbearer's right, viewer's left) side in Karbach's arms. The charge on the sinister (armsbearer's left, viewer's right) side is Saint Quentin, the municipality's patron saint, and he is depicted here, as in the local Saint Quentin's Chapel, holding a palmleaf and a skewer.

== Culture and sightseeing ==
=== Buildings ===
The following are listed buildings or sites in Rhineland-Palatinate's Directory of Cultural Monuments:

- Saint Anne's Catholic Chapel (Kapelle St. Anna), St.-Quintin-Straße 9 – aisleless church, 1770, expansion 1923
- St.-Quintin-Straße 3 – timber-frame Quereinhaus (a combination residential and commercial house divided for these two purposes down the middle, perpendicularly to the street), partly solid, early 18th century
- Saint Quentin's (former) Parish Church (Pfarrkirche St. Quintin), southwest of the village – aisleless church, essentially mediaeval, interior remodelled in Baroque, 1748; whole complex of buildings with graveyard (see also below)

==== Saint Quentin's ====
The former parish church, Saint Quentin's, from the 12th century on a pilgrimage destination, by reason of its original building goes back to the 10th century, as indeed do the village of Karbach and the Quintenach estate. Although it was destroyed in the Thirty Years' War, it was built up again beginning in 1749 and consecrated anew in 1751. The one-naved church with its quire enclosed on three sides houses a wooden altar from 1275 with an image of Our Lady of Sorrows (Pietà), presumably from the Franciscan monastery at Oberwesel, and a wooden statue of Saint Quentin from the 14th century. Quire windows from 1899, 1909 and 1960, the last time the church underwent a thorough renovation, with images of the namesake saint as well as appearances by the Mother of God give the church's inner space its light.

=== Clubs ===
- Kultur- carnival society (und Karnevalsverein e.V. culture and Carnival)
- Mandolinen- und Blasorchester Rheinhöhe 1932 Karbach e. V. (mandolin and wind orchestra)
- Fußballclub „Blau-Weiß“ Karbach e. V. (football)
- Jugend Club Karbach (JCK) (youth)
- VfB Fanclub Rheinwacht (VfB Stuttgart fanclub)

== Economy and infrastructure ==
Because agricultural operations have generally grown in size, the number of such businesses locally has fallen from 20 to 5. Karbach has also developed into a tourism community and today offers the many hikers the infrastructure that they seek. A few small retailers and service-sector businesses offer the needed services; anything further must be sought in nearby Emmelshausen.

=== Education ===
The Catholic community maintains a kindergarten in the municipality.
