= Birkheim =

- Municipality
- Coat of arms

- Location of Birkheim within Rhein-Hunsrück-Kreis district
- Interactive map of Birkheim
- Location within Germany Location within Rhineland-Palatinate
- Coordinates: 50°7′0.70″N 7°37′18.24″E
- Country: Germany
- State: Rhineland-Palatinate
- District: Rhein-Hunsrück-Kreis
- Municipal assoc.: Hunsrück-Mittelrhein

Government
  - Mayor (2019–24): Rainer Retz

Area
  - Total: 2.3 km^{2} (0.89 sq mi)
- Elevation: 463 m (1,519 ft)

Population (2025-12-31)
  - Total: 143
  - Density: 62/km^{2} (160/sq mi)
- Time zone: UTC+01:00 (CET)
  - Summer (DST): UTC+02:00 (CEST)
- Postal codes: 56291
- Dialling codes: 06746
- Vehicle registration: SIM

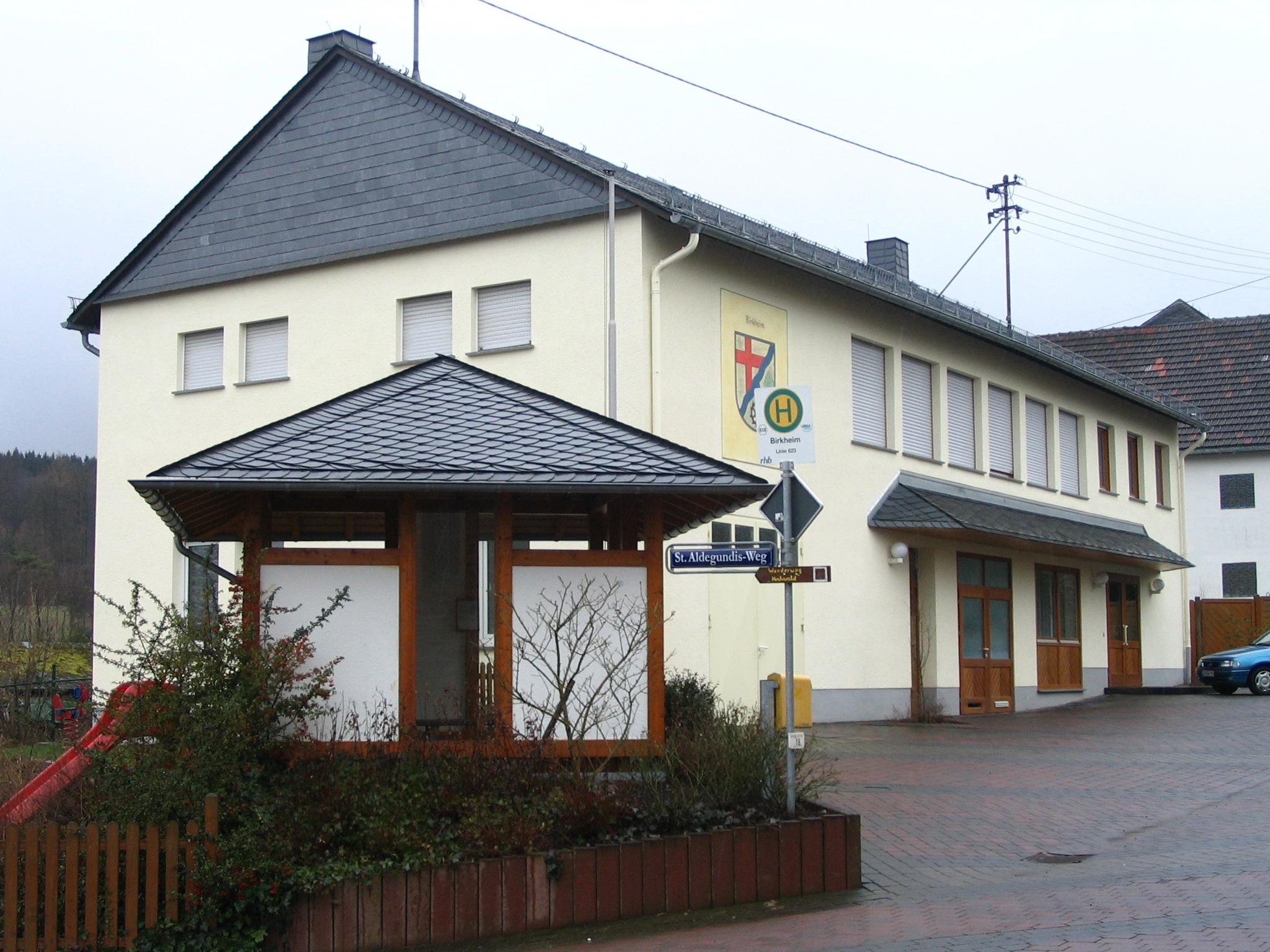
Parish hall

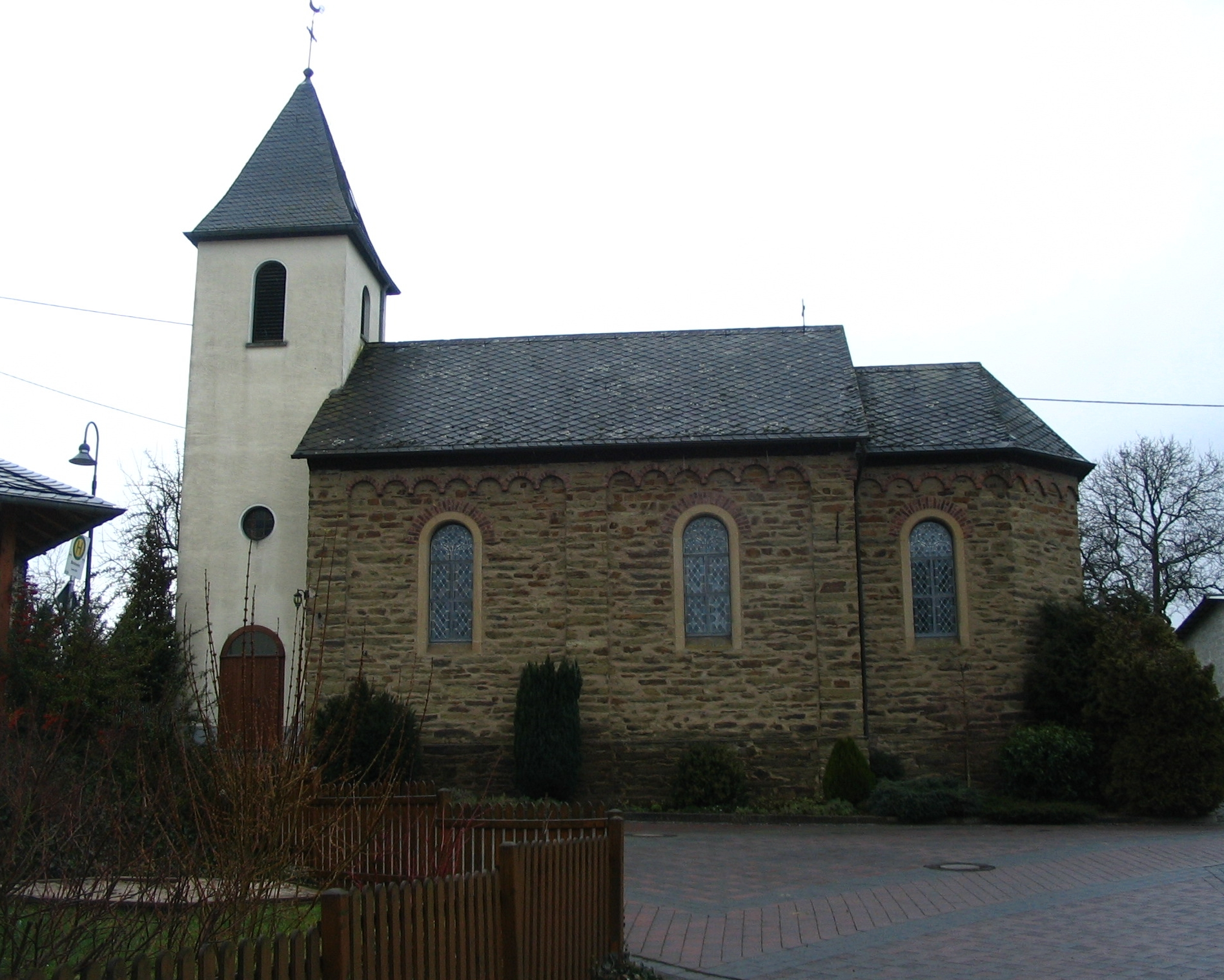
Church

Birkheim (German pronunciation: [ˈbɪʁkhaɪm]) is an Ortsgemeinde – a municipality belonging to a Verbandsgemeinde, a kind of collective municipality – in the Rhein-Hunsrück-Kreis (district) in Rhineland-Palatinate, Germany. It belongs to the Verbandsgemeinde Hunsrück-Mittelrhein, whose seat is in Emmelshausen.

== Geography ==
=== Location ===
The municipality lies in the eastern Hunsrück between the Middle Rhine and Autobahn A 61. Birkheim’s 132 inhabitants live in an area of 220 ha at an elevation of 450 m above sea level.

== History ==
In 1310, Birkheim had its first documentary mention as Bircheym and lay under Electoral-Trier hegemony. Beginning in 1794, Birkheim lay under French rule. In 1815 it was assigned to the Kingdom of Prussia at the Congress of Vienna. Since 1946, it has been part of the then newly founded state of Rhineland-Palatinate.

== Politics ==
=== Municipal council ===
The council is made up of 6 council members, who were elected by majority vote at the municipal election held on 7 June 2009, and the honorary mayor as chairman.

=== Mayor ===
Birkheim’s mayor is Rainer Retz.

=== Coat of arms ===
The German blazon reads: In Silber, halblinks und schrägrechts durch blaue Wellenbalken geteilt, vorn ein rotes Balkenkreuz, hinten oben ein grünes Birkenblatt, unten ein schwarzes Wasserrad.

The municipality’s arms might in English heraldic language be described thus: Argent a bend sinister wavy and couped at the nombril point a bend azure to sinister base, in dexter chief a cross gules throughout, in sinister a birchleaf palewise slipped vert and in base a waterwheel spoked of six sable.

The cross refers to the village’s former allegiance to the Electorate of Trier in the Holy Roman Empire. The waterwheel refers to the Friedrich Neubauer gristmill, known as Fritze Mühle, which was destroyed in the 1920s. The birchleaf is a canting charge for the municipality’s name, Birkheim (Birke is German for birch). The wavy bend sinister and half bend represent local streams, the longer being the Niederbach, which once formed the boundary between the Electorate of Trier and the Vogtei of Pfalzfeld, and the shorter the Quänkelbach, which runs through the village and empties into the Niederbach.

== Culture and sightseeing ==
=== Buildings ===
The following are listed buildings or sites in Rhineland-Palatinate’s Directory of Cultural Monuments:

- Saint John of Nepomuk’s Catholic Chapel (branch chapel; Filialkapelle St. Johann Nepomuk), Hauptstraße 17 – aisleless church, marked 1897, west tower 1960
- Hauptstraße 5 – Quereinhaus (a combination residential and commercial house divided for these two purposes down the middle, perpendicularly to the street); timber-frame building, partly solid and slated, early 19th century
