= Ney, Germany =

Ney
- Municipality
- Coat of arms

- Location of Ney within Rhein-Hunsrück-Kreis district
- Interactive map of Ney
- Location within Germany Location within Rhineland-Palatinate
- Coordinates: 50°11′3″N 7°32′17″E
- Country: Germany
- State: Rhineland-Palatinate
- District: Rhein-Hunsrück-Kreis
- Municipal assoc.: Hunsrück-Mittelrhein
- Subdivisions: 4

Government
  - Mayor (2019–24): Sascha Thönges

Area
  - Total: 5.61 km^{2} (2.17 sq mi)
- Elevation: 380 m (1,250 ft)

Population (2025-12-31)
  - Total: 374
  - Density: 66.7/km^{2} (173/sq mi)
- Time zone: UTC+01:00 (CET)
  - Summer (DST): UTC+02:00 (CEST)
- Postal codes: 56283
- Dialling codes: 06747
- Vehicle registration: SIM

Ney is an Ortsgemeinde – a municipality belonging to a Verbandsgemeinde, a kind of collective municipality – in the Rhein-Hunsrück-Kreis (district) in Rhineland-Palatinate, Germany. It belongs to the Verbandsgemeinde Hunsrück-Mittelrhein, whose seat is in Emmelshausen.

== Geography ==
=== Location ===
The municipality lies in the Hunsrück some 6 km southwest of the Rhine at Boppard, the nearest major town. Emmelshausen lies 3 km to the southeast.

=== Constituent communities ===
Ney’s Ortsteile are Dieler, Schönecker Mühle and Hierenmühle in the Ehrbach valley.

== History ==
Ney belonged to the Gallscheider Gericht (“Gallscheid Court”) at Emmelshausen in the Electorate of Trier. Beginning in 1794, Ney lay under French rule. In 1815 it was assigned to the Kingdom of Prussia at the Congress of Vienna. Since 1946, it has been part of the then newly founded state of Rhineland-Palatinate.

== Politics ==
=== Municipal council ===
The council is made up of 8 council members, who were elected by majority vote at the municipal election held on 7 June 2009, and the honorary mayor as chairman.

=== Mayor ===
Ney’s mayor is Sascha Thönges.

=== Coat of arms ===
The German blazon reads: Schild geteilt, oben in Rot ein silberner Balken, unten in Silber zwei blaue Sterne, eine eingeschweifte blaue Spitze, belegt mit einem silbernen Stern (2:1).

The municipality’s arms might in English heraldic language be described thus: Per fess gules a fess argent and tierced in mantle of the second and azure three mullets counterchanged.

The red field with the silver fess refers to the former Gallscheider Gericht (“Gallscheid Court”). The lower field shows the heraldic bearing of the Carmelites, who once had many holdings in the municipality. The tinctures azure and argent (blue and silver) symbolize purity.

== Culture and sightseeing ==
=== Buildings ===
The following are listed buildings or sites in Rhineland-Palatinate’s Directory of Cultural Monuments:

==== Ney (main centre) ====
- Saint Wendelin's Catholic Church (branch church; Filialkirche St. Wendelinus), Waldstraße 1 – aisleless church, 1754

==== Dieler ====
- Dieler 10 – timber-frame Quereinhaus (a combination residential and commercial house divided for these two purposes down the middle, perpendicularly to the street), partly solid, 18th century

=== Other sites ===
- Neyer Sender (transmitter)
- Schönecker Stahlbrunnen (spring): In 1913, this spring was discovered and a spring house was built, although this now no longer stands. The stones were taken after the Second World War to build houses in Dieler. The water can still be drunk in the vanished building’s cellar, directly from the Stahlbrunnen ("Steel Spring"). The springwater is notable for its high iron content.

=== Regular events ===
- Dorffest (village festival)
- Wendelinus-Kirmes (kermis)
- Geselliger Abend „Wacker Ney“ (social evening)
- Rosenmontagszug Kratzenburg-Ney-Halsenbach (Shrove Monday Carnival parade)
- Wandertag „Wacker Ney“ (hiking day)
- Grillfest „Wacker Ney“ (grilling festival)
- Martinsabend (“Martin’s Evening”)
- Seniorentag (“Seniors’ Day”)

== Economy and infrastructure ==
=== Transport ===
Ney lies near both the Autobahn A 61 and the Hunsrückhöhenstraße ("Hunsrück Heights Road", a scenic road across the Hunsrück built originally as a military road on Hermann Göring's orders), also designated Bundesstraße 61.
