= Utzenhain =

- Municipality
- Coat of arms

- Location of Utzenhain within Rhein-Hunsrück-Kreis district
- Interactive map of Utzenhain
- Location within Germany Location within Rhineland-Palatinate
- Coordinates: 50°7′53.37″N 7°38′23.8″E
- Country: Germany
- State: Rhineland-Palatinate
- District: Rhein-Hunsrück-Kreis
- Municipal assoc.: Hunsrück-Mittelrhein

Government
  - Mayor (2019–24): Marco Brück

Area
  - Total: 4.47 km^{2} (1.73 sq mi)
- Elevation: 400 m (1,300 ft)

Population (2025-12-31)
  - Total: 115
  - Density: 25.7/km^{2} (66.6/sq mi)
- Time zone: UTC+01:00 (CET)
  - Summer (DST): UTC+02:00 (CEST)
- Postal codes: 56291
- Dialling codes: 06746
- Vehicle registration: SIM

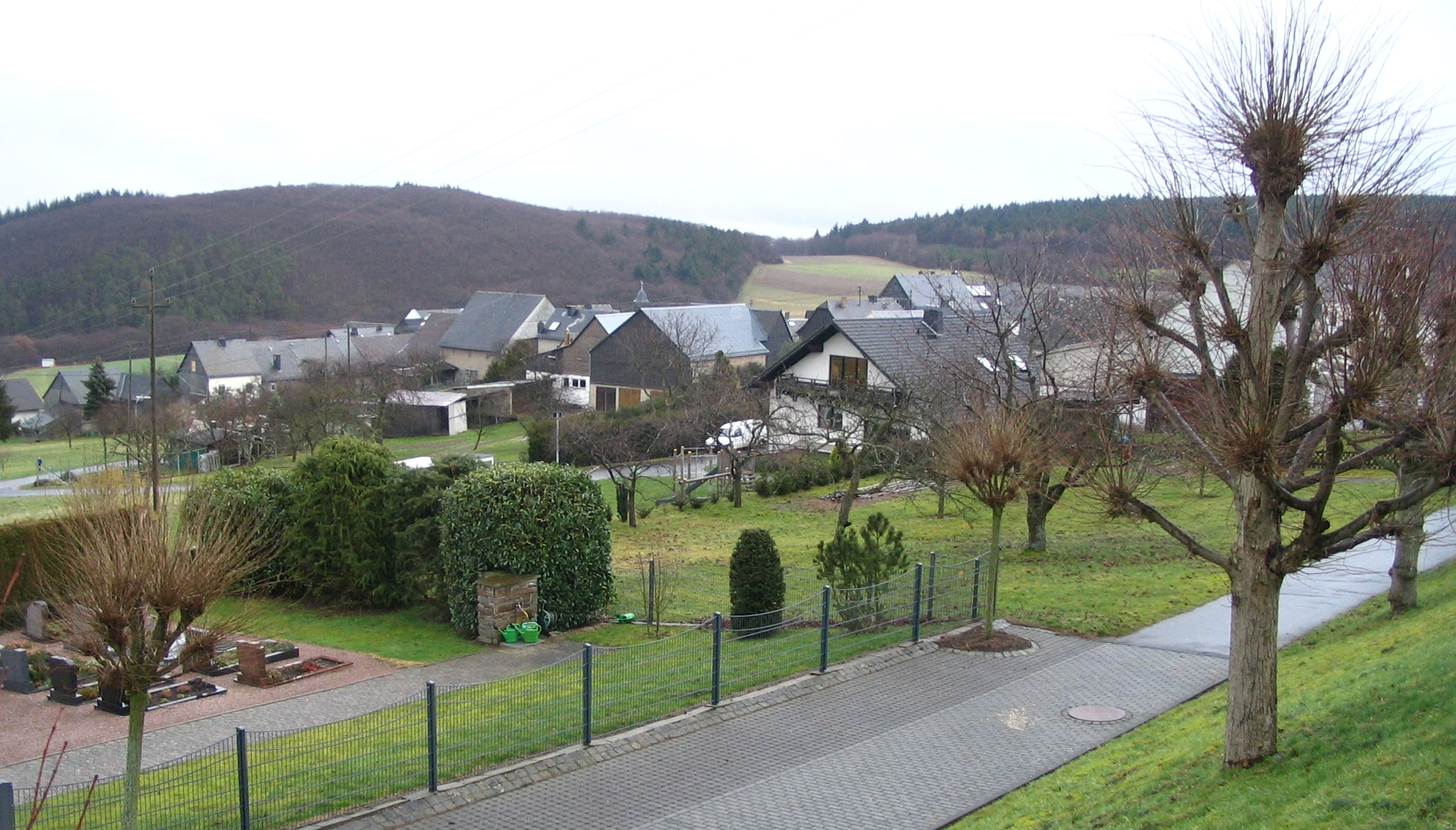
Utzenhain lies on a slope

Utzenhain is an Ortsgemeinde – a municipality belonging to a Verbandsgemeinde, a kind of collective municipality – in the Rhein-Hunsrück-Kreis (district) in Rhineland-Palatinate, Germany. It belongs to the Verbandsgemeinde Hunsrück-Mittelrhein, whose seat is in Emmelshausen.

== Geography ==
=== Location ===
The municipality lies in a sloped location in the eastern Hunsrück between the Rhine Gorge and the Autobahn A 61. North of the village flows the Gründelbach. Utzenhain lies 10 km from each of Emmelshausen, Oberwesel and Sankt Goar, the last two named being at the Hunsrück's outer edge at the Rhine.

== History ==
The village might well have arisen in the early 16th century. Beginning in 1794, Utzenhain lay under French rule. In 1814 it was assigned to the Kingdom of Prussia at the Congress of Vienna. Since 1946, it has been part of the then newly founded state of Rhineland-Palatinate.

== Politics ==
=== Municipal council ===
The council is made up of 6 council members, who were elected by majority vote at the municipal election held on 7 June 2009, and the honorary mayor as chairman.

=== Mayor ===
Utzenhain's mayor is Marco Brück.

=== Coat of arms ===
The German blazon reads: Von gold über blau geteilt, oben ein blaubewehrter, -gezungter und -gekrönter wachsender leopardierter roter Löwe an der Teilung, unten vorn Fruchtstand und hinten zwei Blätter der Hainbuche in silber.

The municipality's arms might in English heraldic language be described thus: Per fess Or a lion rampant couped just above the line of partition at the thighs guardant and with a forked tail gules armed, langued and crowned azure, and azure a hornbeam seed catkin slipped palewise embowed to dexter, the stem to chief and two hornbeam leaves conjoined at the stem couped bendwise sinister, the stems to chief, the two charges in fess argent.

The charge above the line of partition, the lion, is a reference to the village's former allegiance to the Counts of Katzenelnbogen. The two charges below refer to the municipality's great wealth of wooded land and its ever-important forestry using parts of the European hornbeam, a common tree in Utzenhain's woods. The tinctures used in the arms are drawn from those borne by the Counts of Katzenelnbogen and by the House of Hesse, which eventually inherited the Katzenelnbogen lordship.

== Culture and sightseeing ==
=== Buildings ===
The following are listed buildings or sites in Rhineland-Palatinate’s Directory of Cultural Monuments:

- Before Hauptstraße 18 – former town hall tower; three-floor tower with tapered cupola, 1782
- Between Zum Eichenberg 6 and 12 – fire engine house; one-floor quarrystone building, marked 1840
- Before Zum Eichenberg 10 – warriors’ memorial, pylon with soldier

Among Utzenhain's other noteworthy sights are the renovated village square and an old mill.
