= Kratzenburg =

- Municipality
- Coat of arms

- Location of Kratzenburg within Rhein-Hunsrück-Kreis district
- Interactive map of Kratzenburg
- Location within Germany Location within Rhineland-Palatinate
- Coordinates: 50°11′14″N 7°33′17″E
- Country: Germany
- State: Rhineland-Palatinate
- District: Rhein-Hunsrück-Kreis
- Municipal assoc.: Hunsrück-Mittelrhein

Government
  - Mayor (2023–24): Björn Seis

Area
  - Total: 7.07 km^{2} (2.73 sq mi)
- Elevation: 395 m (1,296 ft)

Population (2025-12-31)
  - Total: 405
  - Density: 57.3/km^{2} (148/sq mi)
- Time zone: UTC+01:00 (CET)
  - Summer (DST): UTC+02:00 (CEST)
- Postal codes: 56283
- Dialling codes: 06747
- Vehicle registration: SIM

Kratzenburg (German pronunciation: [ˈkʁatsn̩bʊʁk]) is an Ortsgemeinde – a municipality belonging to a Verbandsgemeinde, a kind of collective municipality – in the Rhein-Hunsrück-Kreis (district) in Rhineland-Palatinate, Germany. It belongs to the Verbandsgemeinde Hunsrück-Mittelrhein, whose seat is in Emmelshausen.

== Geography ==
=== Location ===
The municipality lies in the Hunsrück roughly 4 km north of Emmelshausen and also 4 km from the Rhine to the northeast at Boppard.

== History ==
Kratzenburg is said to be one of the oldest municipalities in the Vorderhunsrück (“Further Hunsrück”). In 975, it had its first documentary mention as Cratzenberh in a document from Otto II, Holy Roman Emperor, although this document might well be a mediaeval forgery. Kratzenburg appeared in connection with Saint Peter's Parish Church (Pfarrkirche St. Peter) at Boppard: “ The village of Cratzenberh in the Gau of Trier, in Sicco’s county transfers to the parish church in the document three Königshufen.” Hufe was a word used in German to denote a rural settlement with farm and living buildings and the attendant cropland. A Königshufe (plural: Königshufen; literally “king’s Hufe), however, was a Hufe four times the usual size.

The first document that can be dated with certainty in which Kratzenburg is mentioned comes from 1245. According to this, the village belonged to the Gallscheider Gericht (“Gallscheid Court”) at Emmelshausen. In the 14th century, this court's whole zone of jurisdiction ended up in Electoral-Trier hands.

Beginning in 1794, Kratzenburg lay under French rule. In 1815 it was assigned to the Kingdom of Prussia at the Congress of Vienna. Since 1946, it has been part of the then newly founded state of Rhineland-Palatinate.

=== Name’s origin ===
The village's namesake might have been a wooden Roman watchtower, also called “Katz”. This tower supposedly once stood in the rural cadastral area now called “Auf der Katz”. Crates comes from the Latin and means, roughly, “wood-bound” or “bound together out of wood”. In the course of the two Germanic sound shifts, the ending shifted to —tz. With the insertion of the syllable —en— and the addition of the German placename ending —berg (originally —berh) arose something akin to the current name, although over the ages, this has shifted to —burg.

== Politics ==
=== Municipal council ===
The council is made up of 8 council members, who were elected by majority vote at the municipal election held on 7 June 2009, and the honorary mayor as chairman.

=== Mayor ===
Kratzenburg's mayor is Björn Seis.

=== Coat of arms ===
The German blazon reads: In geteiltem Schild oben ein roter Balken in Gold, belegt mit einem Schwarzen Schwert, unten ein silberner Schrägbalken, belegt mit drei schwarzen Schwalben.

The municipality's arms might in English heraldic language be described thus: Per fess Or a fess gules, the whole surmounted by a sword palewise sable, the point to chief, and gules a bend argent charged with three swallows volant of the third.

The German blazon does not mention the field tincture for the lower field in the escutcheon, namely gules (red).

The part of the arms above the line of partition refers to the arms once borne by the Gallscheider Gericht (“Gallscheid Court”) at Emmelshausen, while the charge surmounting (that is, overlying) the pattern recalls the old execution place in Kratzenburg, known as Henkerstein or Enkerstein. Below the line of partition are the arms once borne by the family Wilhelm von Schwalbach. The charge on the bend (diagonal stripe) – the three swallows – is canting for this family's name: “swallow” is Schwalbe in German.

== Culture and sightseeing ==
=== Buildings ===
The following are listed buildings or sites in Rhineland-Palatinate’s Directory of Cultural Monuments:

- Saint Michael’s Catholic Church (branch church; Filialkirche St. Michael), Hauptstraße 6 – Gothic Revival aisleless church, 1913; in the graveyard a warriors’ memorial, basalt block with angel; whole complex of buildings with graveyard
- Blumenstraße 4 – former rectory; estate complex along the street; timber-frame building, latter half of the 17th century, side of estate and timber-frame stable 18th century
- Hauptstraße 43 – timber-frame Quereinhaus (a combination residential and commercial house divided for these two purposes down the middle, perpendicularly to the street), partly solid, mid 19th century
- Hunsrückbahn (monumental zone) – part of the line built between 1906 and 1908, one of the Prussian State Railway’s steepest stretches of line

=== Clubs ===
- Gesangverein Frohsinn Kratzenburg e.V., founded in 1907 (singing)
- Kratzenburger Carnevalsverein (KCV; Carnival)
- Jugendraum "Keller" (youth meeting place)
