= Niederburg =

- Municipality
- Coat of arms

- Location of Niederburg within Rhein-Hunsrück-Kreis district
- Interactive map of Niederburg
- Location within Germany Location within Rhineland-Palatinate
- Coordinates: 50°7′8″N 7°41′53″E
- Country: Germany
- State: Rhineland-Palatinate
- District: Rhein-Hunsrück-Kreis
- Municipal assoc.: Hunsrück-Mittelrhein

Government
  - Mayor (2019–24): Jörg Oppenhäuser

Area
  - Total: 6.81 km^{2} (2.63 sq mi)
- Elevation: 327 m (1,073 ft)

Population (2025-12-31)
  - Total: 650
  - Density: 95/km^{2} (250/sq mi)
- Time zone: UTC+01:00 (CET)
  - Summer (DST): UTC+02:00 (CEST)
- Postal codes: 55432
- Dialling codes: 06744
- Vehicle registration: SIM
- Website: www.niederburg.de

Niederburg (German pronunciation: [ˈniːdɐbʊʁk]) is an Ortsgemeinde – a municipality belonging to a Verbandsgemeinde, a kind of collective municipality – in the Rhein-Hunsrück-Kreis (district) in Rhineland-Palatinate, Germany. It belongs to the Verbandsgemeinde Hunsrück-Mittelrhein, whose seat is in Emmelshausen.

== Geography ==
=== Location ===
The clump village of Niederburg lies at the edge of the Hunsrück near the Rhine with a view of three of the Middle Rhine's famous castles, standing in Oberwesel: the Schönburg, the Burg Gutenfels and the Burg Pfalzgrafenstein. The municipal area measures 6.78 km^{2}, of which 3.17 km^{2} is wooded.

== History ==
Niederburg is believed to have arisen sometime in the 10th century. Only in 1286, however, did Nyderinberc have its first documentary mention. The first settlers were charcoal makers, farmers and craftsmen. In 1309, it is known from evidence that there was a church in Niederburg, which Prince-Archbishop-Elector Werner von Falkenstein raised to parish church in 1386.

In the 14th century, the village had special privileges. Even in the time around 1550, it was second in population in the Electoral-Trier Amt of Oberwesel only to Oberwesel itself.

A disagreement between Prince-Archbishop-Elector Werner von Falkenstein and the town of Oberwesel escalated in 1390 into an armed confrontation, the so-called Weseler Krieg ("Wesel War" – Oberwesel was known as Wesel in those days). For the first time in the Rhineland's history, fighting here involved cannon. These were emplaced on the nearby Niederenberg (mountain). The town lay under siege for more than a year before it finally gave up on 9 October 1391. Shortly thereafter, Niederburg acquired the form of its name that is still used now. Because of the war, Niederburg's status as part of Oberwesel was abolished. There are even clues in documents from 1414 ("oppidum Nydernberg prope dictam Wesaliam") that Niederburg had been raised to town.

In 1434, though, Niederburg's autonomy was revoked, and through Archbishop Raban von Helmstatt's actions, it was once again merged with the town of Oberwesel. Niederburg has formed a self-administering municipality since 1786. Beginning in 1794, it lay under French rule. In 1814 it was assigned to the Kingdom of Prussia at the Congress of Vienna. After the First World War, Niederburg was once again occupied by the French. In the Second World War, 52 bombs were dropped in and around Niederburg in an Allied air-raid shortly after 13:00 on 21 November 1944. The target is believed to have been the railway line that ran through a dale by Niederburg. Two of the bombs fell in the village centre, killing two people. Since 1946, Niederburg has been part of the then newly founded state of Rhineland-Palatinate.

== Politics ==
=== Municipal council ===
The council is made up of 12 council members, who were elected by majority vote at the municipal election held on 7 June 2009, and the honorary mayor as chairman.

=== Mayor ===
Niederburg's mayor is Jörg Oppenhäuser.

=== Coat of arms ===
The German blazon reads: In silbernem Schild, über grünem Hügel (Dreiberg) ein rotes zinnengekröntes Burghaus mit 5 Fenstern und 2 Schießscharten, über dem Tor mit Fallgitter, in silbernem Schildchen ein rotes Kreuz.

The municipality's arms might in English heraldic language be described thus: Argent in base a mount of three vert, above which a castle house embattled of six gules with five windows in fess of the field and two arrowslits, one each side of a gateway with half-open portcullis, above which an escutcheon of the field charged with a cross of the third.

The main charge in these arms refers to the municipality's name, and is thus canting. "Castle" in German is "Burg". The charge is the Niederburg castle house, where cannon were deployed for the first time in military action in the Rhineland. The small inescutcheon above the gateway symbolizes the village's former allegiance to the Electorate of Trier. The "mount of three", a charge called a Dreiberg in German, refers to the hilly countryside around Niederburg.

== Culture and sightseeing ==
=== Buildings ===
The following are listed buildings or sites in Rhineland-Palatinate's Directory of Cultural Monuments:

- Saint Stephen's Catholic Parish Church (Pfarrkirche St. Stephan), Kirchstraße – west tower, early 13th century, quire about 1380, nave 1746, after 1945 expanded into three-naved church; whole complex of buildings with graveyard (see also below)
- Brunnenstraße – fountain, Gothic Revival, Rheinböllen Ironworks, latter half of the 19th century
- Brunnenstraße/corner of Rheingoldstraße – warriors' memorial; small complex with relief and plaques, 1920s
- Near Burgstraße 3 – remnants of the Castle Niederburg: in the north a round corner tower, in the south a tower foundation, in between a two-floor piece of wall with arches and niches (see also below)
- Rheingoldstraße 22 – house with single roof peak, timber-frame, marked 1732; whole complex of buildings
- Ringstraße 10 – former school and bakehouse; plastered building, marked 1822, brick addition, 1901; fountain, 19th century, possibly from the Rheinböllen Ironworks; whole complex of buildings
- Chapel, west of the village Auf dem Leh unter dem Helligenweg – quarrystone aisleless church, marked 1882

==== Further information about buildings ====
===== Saint Stephen's Church =====
Niederburg's village church, whose patron by visitation protocol in 1657 is Saint Stephen, and which was first mentioned in 1309, still has its original Romanesque tower. This houses two bells from the Middle Ages which were poured in 1427 and 1477 by bellfounder Tyllmann von Hachenburg and which survived both the Thirty Years' War and the Second World War. The heavier bell, which weighs 1,350 kg, is named Maria, while the lighter one, weighing only 1,000 kg, is named Stephanus. In 1954, when the church was expanded, the municipality got two further bells. These came from the Mabilon Bellfoundry in Saarburg and weigh 520 kg and 500 kg. They are dedicated to Saint Joseph, Saint Lawrence and Saint Maria Goretti.

In the Middle Ages, Niederburg belonged to the archdeaconry of Karden and the rural chapter of Boppard. In 1802, Niederburg passed as a curacy in the newly formed canton of St. Goar to the Diocese of Aachen, although in 1824, it was transferred back to the Diocese of Trier. Since 1827, Niederburg has belonged to the deaconry of St. Goar.

===== Castle Niederburg =====
Of the former castle complex of Niederburg, there are only remnants left today. These are from the enclosing wall and the wall-lined moat. When and by whom the castle was destroyed is knowledge that has been lost to history.

== Economy and infrastructure ==
Until 2000, there was winegrowing around Niederburg, but in that year, the last winegrower had his vines cleared, and no wine has been made in the municipality since.
