= Heinzenbach =

- Municipality
- Coat of arms

- Location of Heinzenbach within Rhein-Hunsrück-Kreis district
- Interactive map of Heinzenbach
- Location within Germany Location within Rhineland-Palatinate
- Coordinates: 49°58′31″N 7°25′0″E
- Country: Germany
- State: Rhineland-Palatinate
- District: Rhein-Hunsrück-Kreis
- Municipal assoc.: Kirchberg

Government
  - Mayor (2019–24): Günter Schumann

Area
  - Total: 3.42 km^{2} (1.32 sq mi)
- Elevation: 360 m (1,180 ft)

Population (2025-12-31)
  - Total: 415
  - Density: 121/km^{2} (314/sq mi)
- Time zone: UTC+01:00 (CET)
  - Summer (DST): UTC+02:00 (CEST)
- Postal codes: 55483
- Dialling codes: 06763
- Vehicle registration: SIM

Heinzenbach (German pronunciation: [ˈhaɪntsn̩bax]) is an Ortsgemeinde – a municipality belonging to a Verbandsgemeinde, a kind of collective municipality – in the Rhein-Hunsrück-Kreis (district) in Rhineland-Palatinate, Germany. It belongs to the Verbandsgemeinde of Kirchberg, whose seat is in the like-named town.

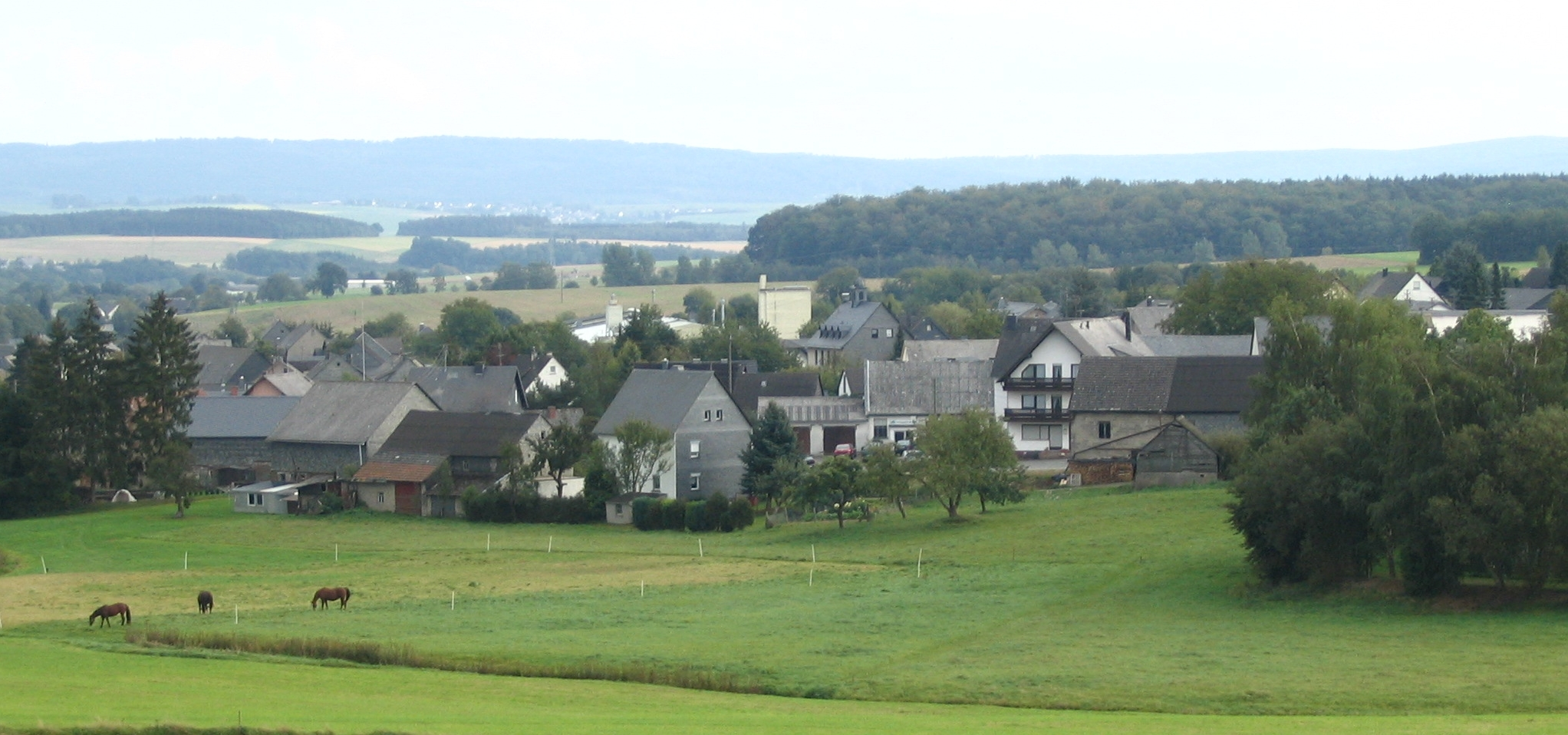
Heinzenbach from the north

== Geography ==
=== Location ===
The municipality lies in the Hunsrück roughly halfway between Reckershausen and Unzenberg, about 3 km north of Kirchberg and about 6 km west of Simmern.

== History ==
Bearing witness to Heinzenbach's very early history are a great barrow in District 6 of In der Küch, the municipal forest, and a trove of Roman coins from some time between AD 276 and 282.

In 1310, Heinzenbach had its first documentary mention in the Sponheimisches Gefälleregister, a taxation register kept by the County of Sponheim. In the Middle Ages, the village was held by the Ravengiersburg Monastery, but most of the inhabitants were subjects of the Counts of Sponheim. Beginning in 1794, Heinzenbach lay under French rule. In 1815 it was assigned to the Kingdom of Prussia at the Congress of Vienna. Since 1946, it has been part of the then newly founded state of Rhineland-Palatinate.

== Politics ==
=== Municipal council ===
The council is made up of 8 council members, who were elected at the municipal election held on 7 June 2009, and the honorary mayor as chairman.

=== Mayor ===
Heinzenbach's mayor is Günter Schumann, and his deputy is Ralf Dieter Diel.

=== Coat of arms ===
The German blazon reads: Gespalten von schwarz und gold, vorn ein linksgewendeter und rotgezungter und -bewehrter goldener Löwe, hinten geteilt durch einen blauen Wellenbalken, oben zwei gekreuzte schwarze Berghämmer, unten zwei schwarze Mühlräder, balkenweise.

The municipality's arms might in English heraldic language be described thus: Per pale sable a lion rampant sinister Or armed and langued gules, and Or a fess wavy azure between in chief a hammer and sledge per saltire and in base two waterwheels spoked of eight in fess, all of the first.

Heinzenbach passed after the dissolution of the Ravengiersburg Monastery in 1566 to the Wittelsbach line of Palatinate-Simmern, before which the Wittelsbachs had already held the Vogtei rights since 1408. The lion rampant is found in both the Wittelsbach and Palatinate-Simmern arms, although there he faces dexter (armsbearer's right, viewer's left), whereas here he faces sinister (armsbearer's left, viewer's right). This charge nonetheless stands for the former Palatinate-Simmern lordship in Heinzenbach. The wavy blue fess (horizontal stripe) is canting, for it stands for the local brook (Bach in German), thus referring to the last syllable in the village's name. The crossed hammers stand for the former Neuglück ore mine, which was within the municipality's limits. The two waterwheels recall the two watermills that once stood on the aforesaid brook, also called the Heinzenbach.
