= Lindenschied =

- Municipality
- Coat of arms

- Location of Lindenschied within Rhein-Hunsrück-Kreis district
- Interactive map of Lindenschied
- Location within Germany Location within Rhineland-Palatinate
- Coordinates: 49°54′17″N 7°23′32″E
- Country: Germany
- State: Rhineland-Palatinate
- District: Rhein-Hunsrück-Kreis
- Municipal assoc.: Kirchberg

Government
  - Mayor (2019–24): Timo Ströher

Area
  - Total: 3.17 km^{2} (1.22 sq mi)
- Elevation: 400 m (1,300 ft)

Population (2025-12-31)
  - Total: 181
  - Density: 57.1/km^{2} (148/sq mi)
- Time zone: UTC+01:00 (CET)
  - Summer (DST): UTC+02:00 (CEST)
- Postal codes: 55481
- Dialling codes: 06763
- Vehicle registration: SIM

Lindenschied (German pronunciation: [ˈlɪndn̩ʃiːt]) is an Ortsgemeinde – a municipality belonging to a Verbandsgemeinde, a kind of collective municipality – in the Rhein-Hunsrück-Kreis (district) in Rhineland-Palatinate, Germany. It belongs to the Verbandsgemeinde of Kirchberg, whose seat is in the like-named town.

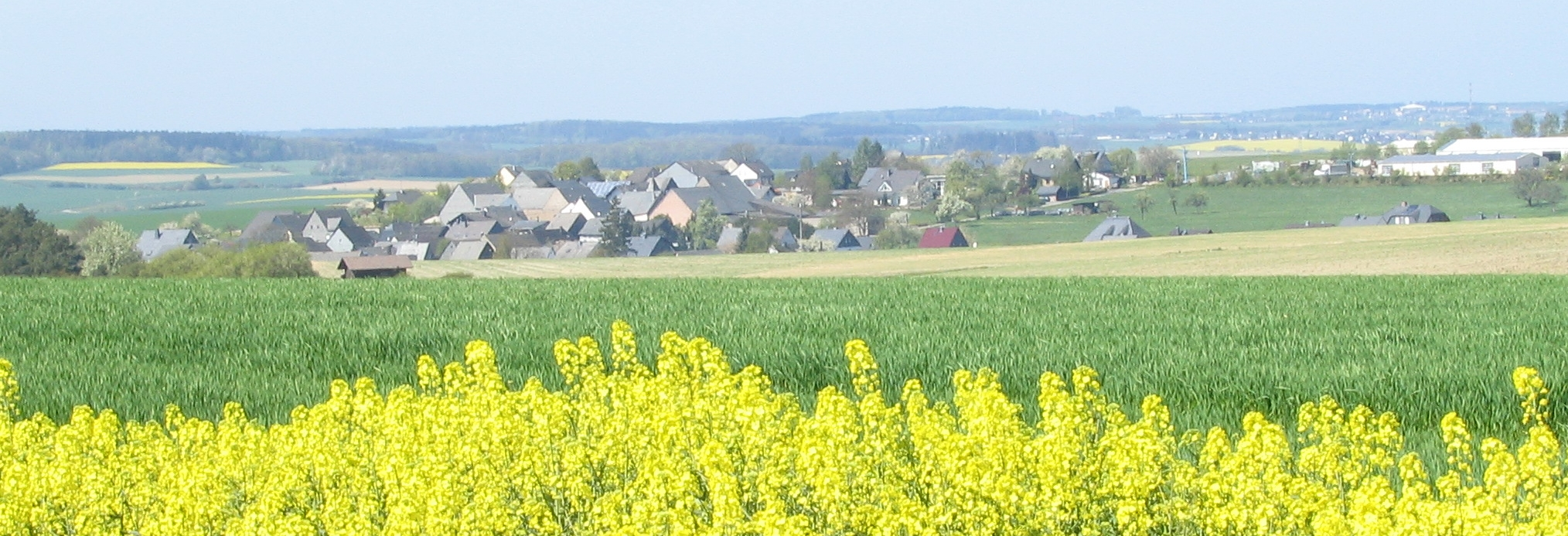
Lindenschied seen from the east

== Geography ==
=== Location ===
The municipality lies in the Hunsrück on a ridge. West of the village flows the Kyrbach and to the east lies Dickenschied, through which runs Bundesstraße 421. Lindenschied lies roughly 5 km south of Kirchberg, 12 km southwest of Simmern and 9 km southeast of Frankfurt-Hahn Airport. The municipal area measures 317 ha, of which 66 ha is wooded.

== History ==
In 1345, Lindenschied, which was then under the High Court of Rhaunen, had its first documentary mention. The document itself stated Lindenschied's, and several other villages’, legal status, which at this time was disputed, particularly as to these villages’ rights and boundaries, between the Waldgraves of Kyrburg, to whom Lindenschied belonged, and the Counts of Sponheim. The dispute was arbitrated in 1354 by Archbishop of Mainz Gerlach von Nassau. Beginning in 1794, Lindenschied lay under French rule. In 1815 it was assigned to the Kingdom of Prussia at the Congress of Vienna. Since 1946, it has been part of the then newly founded state of Rhineland-Palatinate. Until 1969, Lindenschied belonged to the now abolished district of Bernkastel.

== Religion ==
The Evangelical church that stands today was between 1689 and 1907 used by both Evangelicals and Catholics as a simultaneous church. After the church had fallen into considerable disrepair, the Evangelical community renovated the roof and parts of the walls between 1951 and 1953, often doing the work themselves. The ridge turret over the quire was replaced with a newly built tower on the west side. Its wrought-iron cross stood on the churchtower until a storm in 2005, whereupon it was replaced in 2006 with a copper weathercock. Between 1958 and 1963, the walling was secured and the nave was thoroughly renovated. Also, a parish hall was built onto the church.

Lindenschied was until the end of 1975 part of the Evangelical parish of Hausen, which belonged to the church district of Trier. Ever since, the 121 Evangelicals have belonged to the Evangelical parish of Dickenschied in the church district of Simmern-Trarbach.

The Catholic Herz-Jesu-Kapelle (“Heart of Jesus Chapel”) was built in 1908 and 1909. The 70 or so Catholics in Lindenschied belong to the parish of Dickenschied.

The two Jewish families, Mayer and Schloß, emigrated as early as the 1860s to the U.S. They belonged to the synagogue community of Laufersweiler. Lindenschied's Jewish graveyard was levelled after the Second World War.

== Politics ==
=== Town council ===
The council is made up of 6 council members, who were elected by majority vote at the municipal election held on 7 June 2009, and the honorary mayor as chairwoman.

=== Mayor ===
Lindenschied's mayor is Timo Ströher.

=== Coat of arms ===
The German blazon reads: In gespaltenem Schild vorne in blau oben ein silbernes Lindenblatt, darunter schräggekreuzt ein silberner Hammer und Schlägel, hinten in Gold ein blaubewehrter und gezungter roter Löwe.

The municipality's arms might in English heraldic language be described thus: Per pale azure a lime leaf in bend sinister, below which a hammer and a sledge per saltire, all argent, and Or a lion rampant gules armed and langued of the first.

The lime (or linden) leaf stands as a canting charge for the municipality's name, Lindenschied. The two mining tools stand for the slate mining that was once undertaken within municipal limits. The sinister (armsbearer's left, viewer's right) side refers to the former allegiance to the Waldgraviate of Kyrburg and the High Court of Rhaunen.

== Culture and sightseeing ==
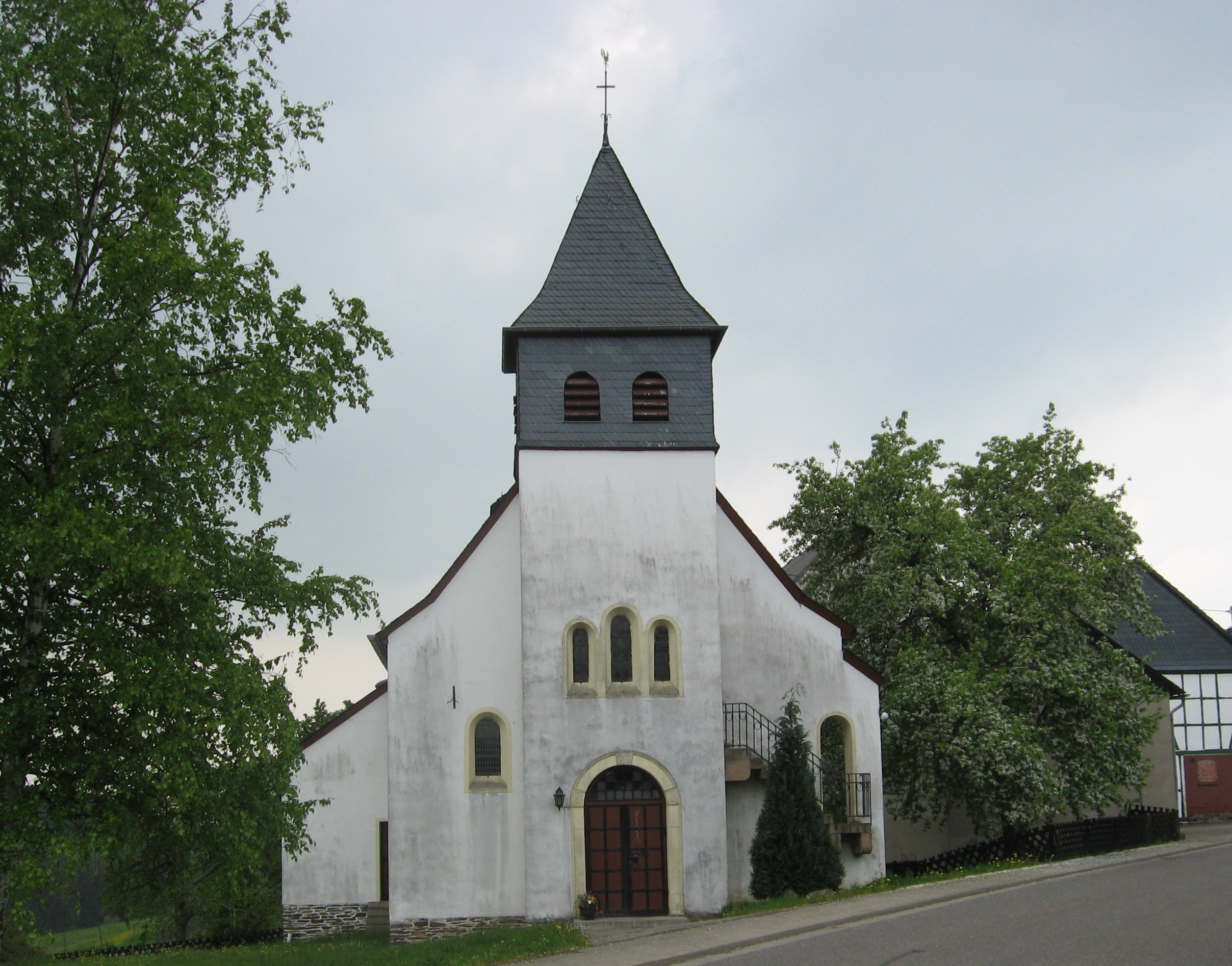
Gartenweg: Heart of Jesus Catholic Chapel

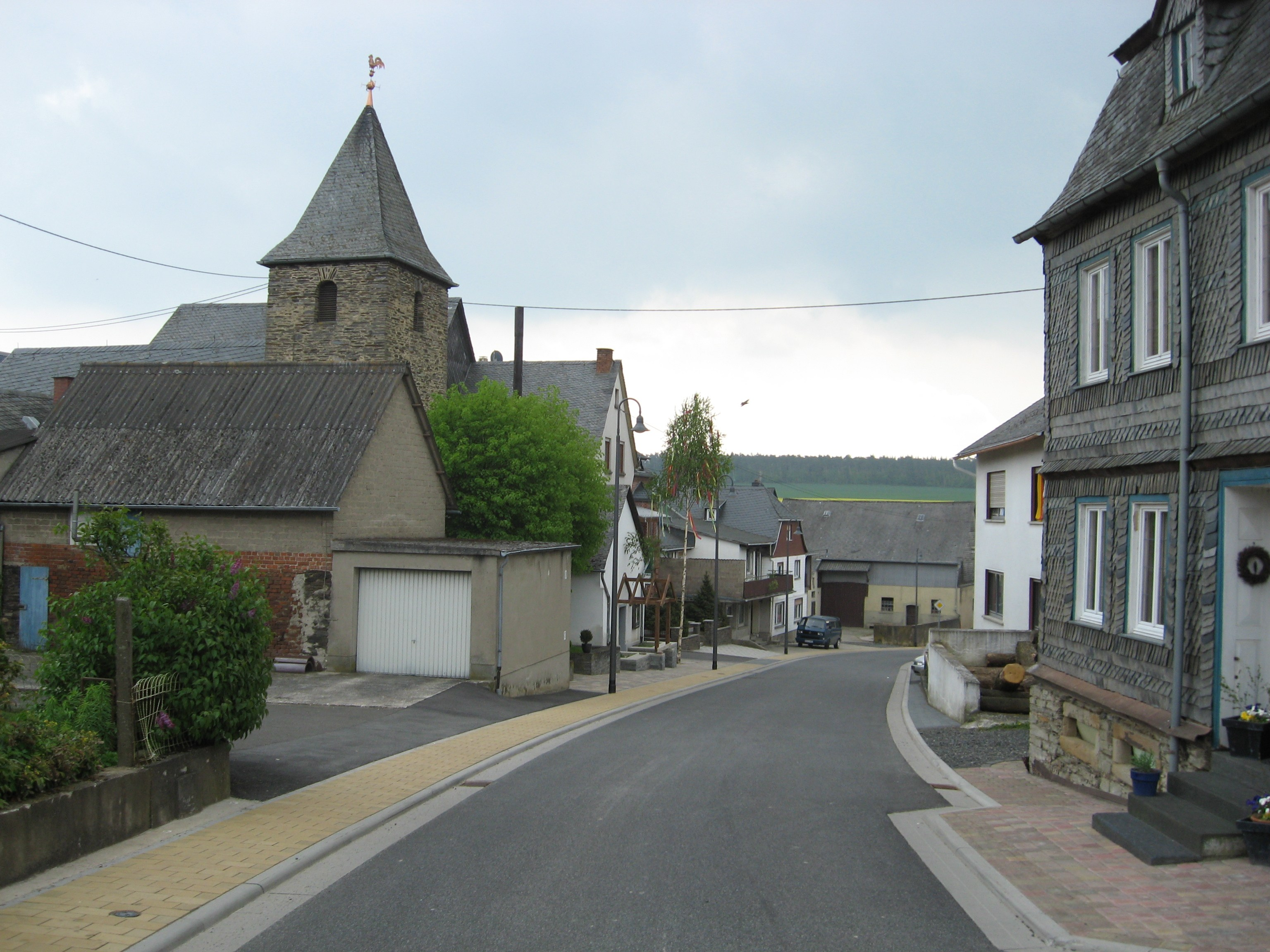
Right: Haus Hauptstraße 14. Left: Evangelical church (about 1689)

=== Buildings ===
The following are listed buildings or sites in Rhineland-Palatinate’s Directory of Cultural Monuments:

- Heart of Jesus Catholic Chapel (Herz-Jesu-Kapelle), Gartenweg – Saalbau, 1908/1909, architect Eduard Endler, Cologne
- Hauptstraße 14 – building with mansard roof, timber framing slated, marked 1879
- Water cistern, on Landesstraße (State Road) 185 going towards Hecken: quarrystone cube, marked 1936

== Economy and infrastructure ==
There was once extensive slate mining in Lindenschied. The industries today are crafts and agriculture.
