= Würrich =

- Municipality
- Coat of arms

- Location of Würrich within Rhein-Hunsrück-Kreis district
- Interactive map of Würrich
- Location within Germany Location within Rhineland-Palatinate
- Coordinates: 49°58′37″N 7°18′11″E
- Country: Germany
- State: Rhineland-Palatinate
- District: Rhein-Hunsrück-Kreis
- Municipal assoc.: Kirchberg (Hunsrück)

Government
  - Mayor (2019–24): Elmar Herberts

Area
  - Total: 4.33 km^{2} (1.67 sq mi)
- Elevation: 450 m (1,480 ft)

Population (2025-12-31)
  - Total: 159
  - Density: 36.7/km^{2} (95.1/sq mi)
- Time zone: UTC+01:00 (CET)
  - Summer (DST): UTC+02:00 (CEST)
- Postal codes: 56858
- Dialling codes: 06543
- Vehicle registration: SIM
- Website: www.wuerrich.de

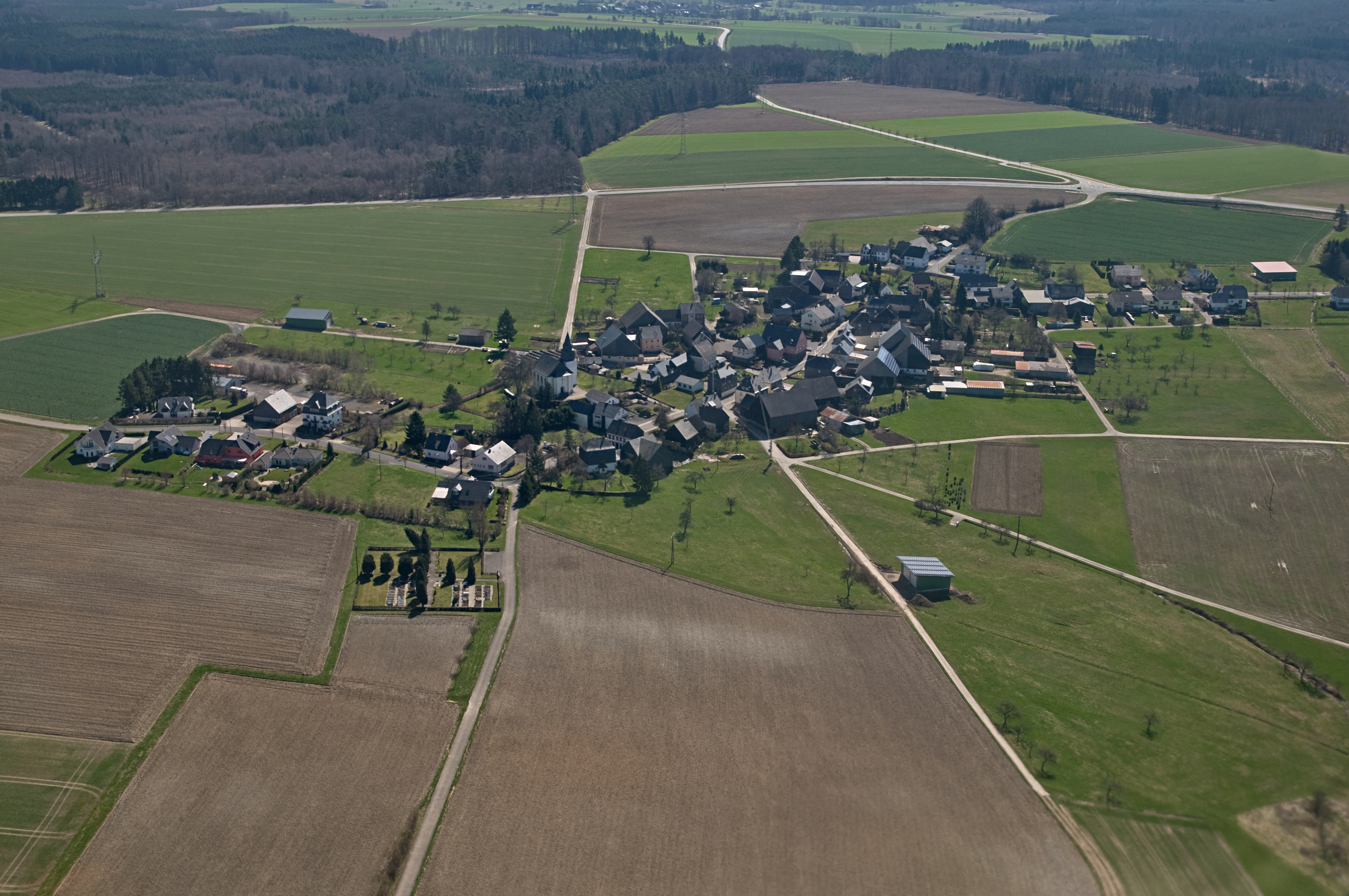
View of Würrich from an airliner (April 2010)

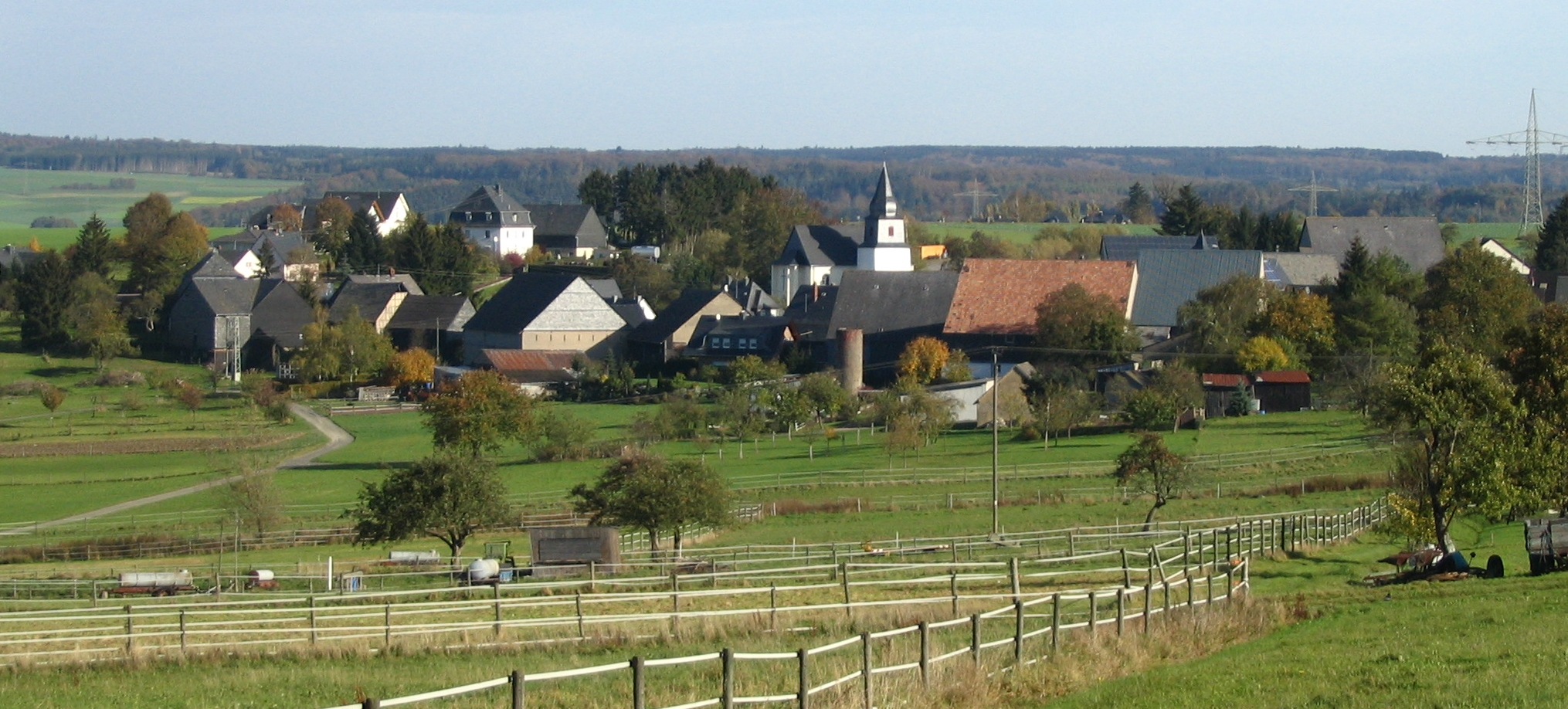
Würrich seen from the west

Würrich is an Ortsgemeinde – a municipality belonging to a Verbandsgemeinde, a kind of collective municipality – in the Rhein-Hunsrück-Kreis (district) in Rhineland-Palatinate, Germany. It belongs to the Verbandsgemeinde of Kirchberg, whose seat is in the like-named town.

== Geography ==
=== Location ===
The municipality lies in the central Hunsrück, right on the Hunsrückhöhenstraße ("Hunsrück Heights Road" – also called Bundesstraße 327 – a scenic road across the Hunsrück built originally as a military road on Hermann Göring's orders), just outside Frankfurt-Hahn Airport, roughly 8 km west-northwest of Kirchberg and 10 km southeast of the Moselle at Zell.

== History ==
Bearing witness to Würrich's early history is a Roman estate that was unearthed in 1870.

In 1295, Würrich had its first documentary mention and was held by the Counts of Sponheim. As early as 1317, a chapel in Würrich was mentioned. In 1437 the village passed to the Margraviate of Baden and the Counts Palatine of the Rhine, who jointly ruled Belg and Würrich. In 1708, their holdings were partitioned and the two villages were assigned to the Margraviate of Baden. Beginning in 1794, Würrich lay under French rule. In 1815 it was assigned to the Kingdom of Prussia at the Congress of Vienna. Since 1946, it has been part of the then newly founded state of Rhineland-Palatinate.

The former Würrich schoolhouse was dismantled and moved from its original site in 1996 to the Roscheider Hof Open Air Museum in Konz. In May 2000, the topping out was celebrated. Thereafter the house served to demonstrate timber framing and helped with school projects about this building style. After further conversions, the house was opened to the general public in 2008.

== Religion ==
The Evangelical parish of Würrich comprises not only the municipality of that name but also Altlay, Belg, Rödelhausen, Peterswald-Löffelscheid, Hahn and Briedel’s outlying centre of Briedeler Heck. The merger with the parish of Hahn and its branch village of Heck came about in 1978.

== Politics ==
=== Municipal council ===
The council is made up of 6 council members, who were elected by majority vote at the municipal election held on 7 June 2009, and the honorary mayor as chairman.

=== Mayor ===
Würrich's mayor is Elmar Herberts, and his deputy is Reinhard Mohr.

=== Coat of arms ===
The German blazon reads: In Bau eine eingeschweifte silberne Spitze, darin eine blaue Kirche mit goldener Tür und goldenem Schalloch; vorn eine goldene ausgerissene Eiche, hinten drei goldene Ähren.

The municipality's arms might in English heraldic language be described thus: Tierced in mantle dexter azure an oaktree eradicated Or, sinister azure an ear of wheat flanked by two ears of rye all couped of the second and in base argent a church of the first with door and sound hole of the second.

The charge in base, the church, is meant to stand for the one found in the village. A chapel is known to have stood in Würrich by 1317; the tapering cupola was added in the 18th century. The oaktree on the dexter (armsbearer's right, viewer's left) side symbolizes the municipality's great wealth of woodland, and the ears of wheat and rye on the sinister (armsbearer's left, viewer's right) side symbolize agriculture, which has characterized the village for hundreds of years.

== Culture and sightseeing ==
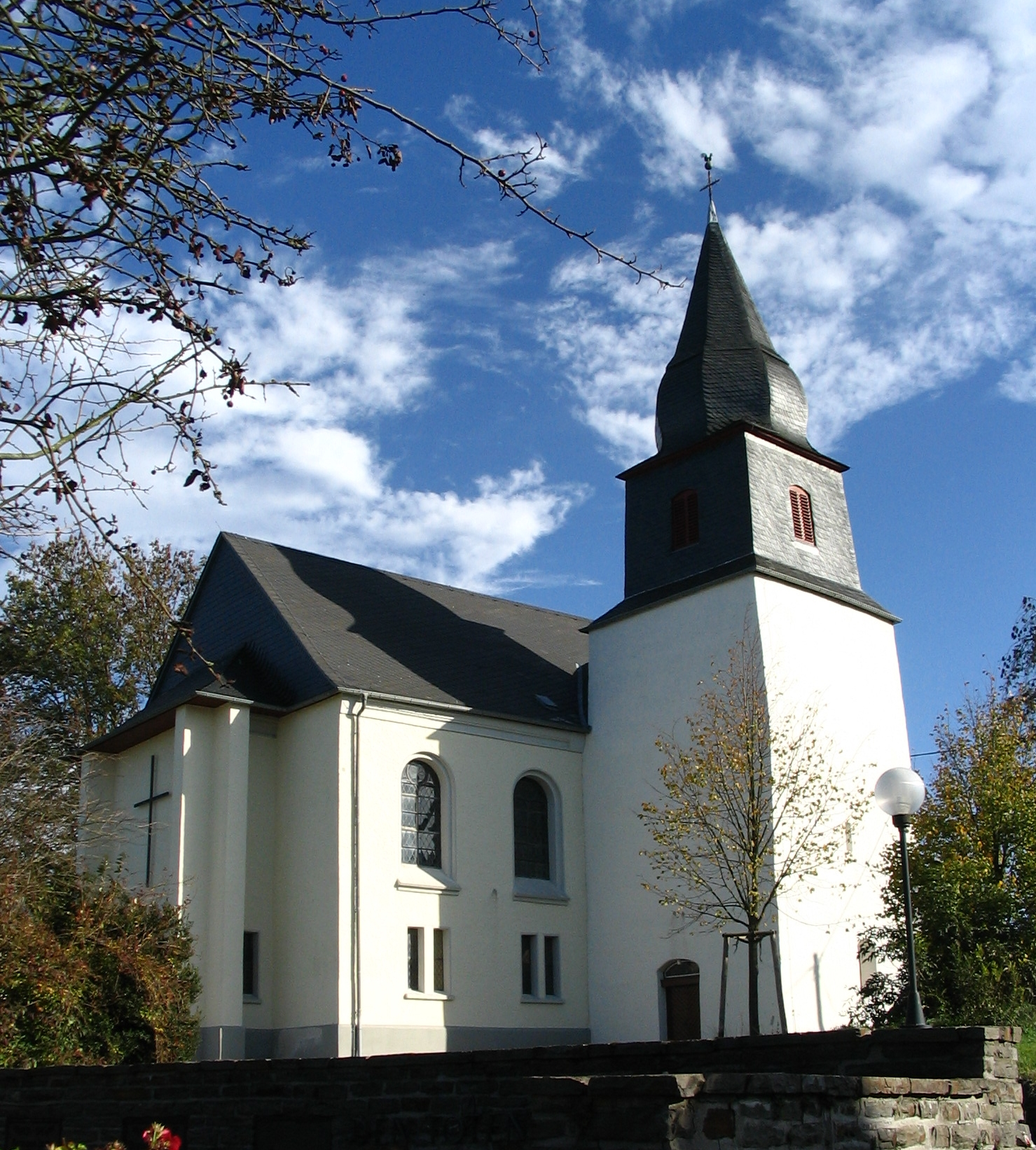
Dorfstraße: Evangelical church

=== Buildings ===
The following are listed buildings or sites in Rhineland-Palatinate’s Directory of Cultural Monuments:

- Evangelical church, Dorfstraße – aisleless church, 1887/1888; former quire tower, latter half of the 13th century, Baroque cupola, 18th century; whole complex of buildings with graveyard
