= Schlierschied =

- Municipality
- Coat of arms

- Location of Schlierschied within Rhein-Hunsrück-Kreis district
- Interactive map of Schlierschied
- Location within Germany Location within Rhineland-Palatinate
- Coordinates: 49°52′34″N 7°26′34″E
- Country: Germany
- State: Rhineland-Palatinate
- District: Rhein-Hunsrück-Kreis
- Municipal assoc.: Kirchberg

Government
  - Mayor (2019–24): Arnold Götz

Area
  - Total: 8.60 km^{2} (3.32 sq mi)
- Elevation: 374 m (1,227 ft)

Population (2025-12-31)
  - Total: 172
  - Density: 20.0/km^{2} (51.8/sq mi)
- Time zone: UTC+01:00 (CET)
  - Summer (DST): UTC+02:00 (CEST)
- Postal codes: 55483
- Dialling codes: 06765
- Vehicle registration: SIM

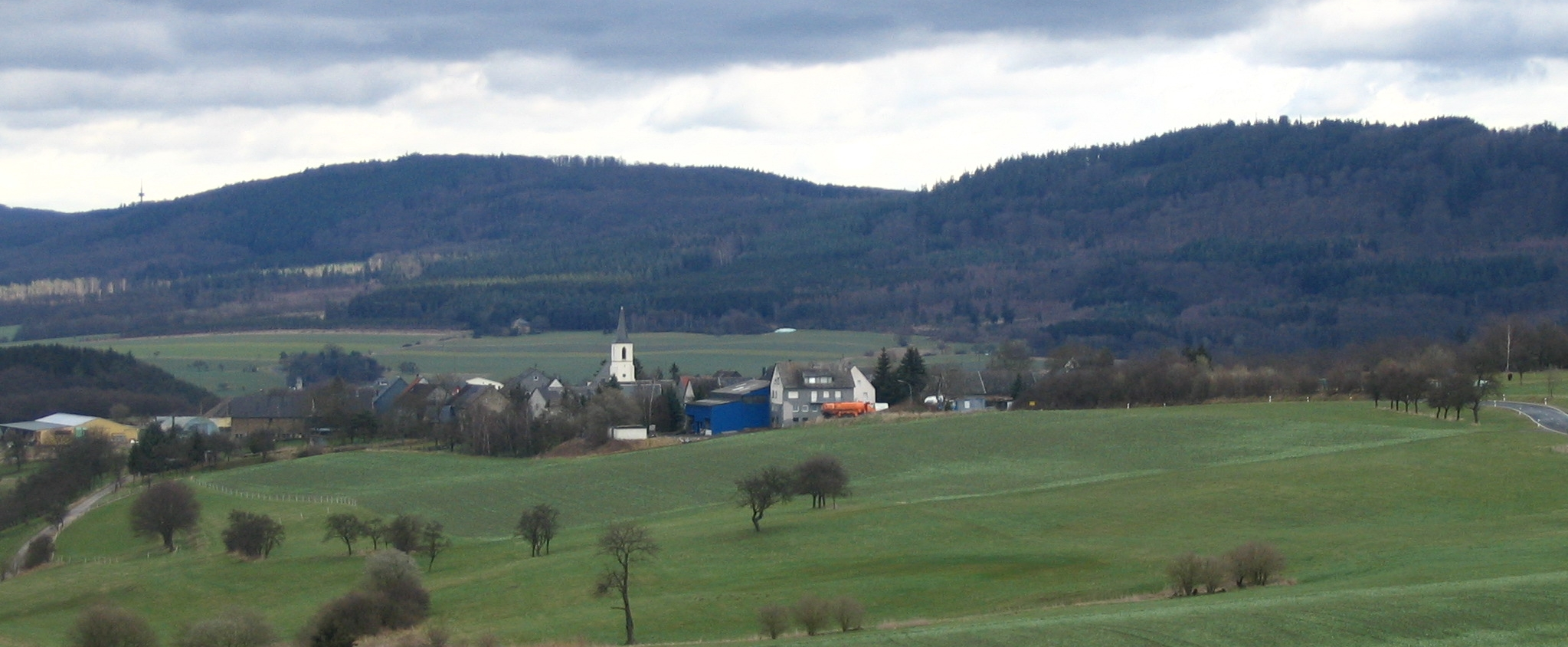
Schlierschied, in the background the Soonwald

Schlierschied is an Ortsgemeinde – a municipality belonging to a Verbandsgemeinde, a kind of collective municipality – in the Rhein-Hunsrück-Kreis (district) in Rhineland-Palatinate, Germany. It belongs to the Verbandsgemeinde of Kirchberg, whose seat is in the like-named town.

== Geography ==
=== Location ===
The municipality lies in the Hunsrück, roughly 8 km south-southeast of Kirchberg and 12 km southwest of Simmern.

=== Constituent communities ===
Standing as integral parts of the municipality are the Brummenmühle and the Anzenfeldermühle (old mills, now homesteads) in the Simmerbach valley.

== History ==
There are many barrows to be found southwest of the village in the municipal forest and the Lützelsoon state forest. prehistoric and protohistoric finds offer clues to early settlement. In 1335, Schlierschied had its first documentary mention in a document from the Ravengiersburg Monastery, which also mentions the village's first chaplain, Johann von Schlierschied. The Counts of Sponheim held the village, while enfeoffing other nobles with various holdings. In the 18th century, the village passed to the Margraviate of Baden. Beginning in 1794, Schlierschied lay under French rule. In 1815 it was assigned to the Kingdom of Prussia at the Congress of Vienna. Since 1946, it has been part of the then newly founded state of Rhineland-Palatinate.

== Religion ==
Most of the village's inhabitants are Evangelical. A chapel consecrated to Saint Mary was mentioned in a document as early as 1335. It belonged to the church district of Gemünden. Beginning in 1609, Schlierschied became a parish in its own right. The new church built in 1882 had been heavily damaged by the time the Second World War ended, but was eventually reconstructed by the inhabitants. In 1978, the Evangelical parishes of Schlierschied and Gemünden were merged.

== Politics ==
=== Municipal council ===
The council is made up of 6 council members, who were elected by majority vote at the municipal election held on 7 June 2009, and the honorary mayor as chairman.

=== Mayor ===
Schlierschied's mayor is Arnold Götz, and his deputy is Eckhard Wichter.

=== Coat of arms ===
The German blazon reads: Über blau-gold geschachtem Schildfuß gespalten. Vorne in Silber eine schwarze Kirche, hinten in Rot über einer silbernen Amphore eine silberne Schale.

The municipality's arms might in English heraldic language be described thus: Above a base countercompony azure and Or, per pale argent a church affronty sable and gules in chief a bowl, under which an amphora to dexter, both of the third.

The base of the escutcheon refers to the Counts of Sponheim. The small chapel on the dexter (armsbearer's right, viewer's left) side had its first documentary mention in 1335. The bowl and the amphora on the sinister (armsbearer's left, viewer's right) side recall archaeological finds from Roman times made in 1951 at digs on the village's outskirts.

== Culture and sightseeing ==
=== Buildings ===
The following are listed buildings or sites in Rhineland-Palatinate’s Directory of Cultural Monuments:

- Evangelical church, Kirchweg – Gothic Revival aisleless church, marked 1882
- In der Struth 19 – former forester's house; timber-frame house, latter half of the 19th century
- Anzenfelder Mühle (mill), east of Schlierschied, near Bundesstraße 421 – building complex of one mill with a sawmill; timber-frame house, 19th century, conversion in the 1950s; former oilmill

== Economy and infrastructure ==
The municipality enjoys some importance as the seat of a building firm belonging to the Wilhelm Faber GmbH group.
