= Dillendorf =

- Municipality
- Coat of arms

- Location of Dillendorf within Rhein-Hunsrück-Kreis district
- Interactive map of Dillendorf
- Location within Germany Location within Rhineland-Palatinate
- Coordinates: 49°55′30.23″N 7°23′0.7″E
- Country: Germany
- State: Rhineland-Palatinate
- District: Rhein-Hunsrück-Kreis
- Municipal assoc.: Kirchberg

Government
  - Mayor (2019–24): Renate Paschke

Area
  - Total: 6.49 km^{2} (2.51 sq mi)
- Elevation: 416 m (1,365 ft)

Population (2025-12-31)
  - Total: 543
  - Density: 83.7/km^{2} (217/sq mi)
- Time zone: UTC+01:00 (CET)
  - Summer (DST): UTC+02:00 (CEST)
- Postal codes: 55481
- Dialling codes: 06763
- Vehicle registration: SIM
- Website: www.dillendorf.de

Dillendorf (German pronunciation: [ˈdɪləndɔʁf]) is an Ortsgemeinde – a municipality belonging to a Verbandsgemeinde, a kind of collective municipality – in the Rhein-Hunsrück-Kreis (district) in Rhineland-Palatinate, Germany. It belongs to the Verbandsgemeinde of Kirchberg, whose seat is in the like-named town.

== Geography ==
=== Location ===
The municipality lies in the central Hunsrück in the Kyrbach valley at a mean elevation of 340 m above sea level. The historic Via Ausonia (or Ausoniusstraße in German) runs through Dillendorf.

=== Constituent communities ===
Dillendorf’s Ortsteile are the outlying village of Liederbach and the main village, also called Dillendorf.

== History ==
There are more than 80 barrows along the Via Ausonia, and there have been quite a few archaeological finds from Late La Tène times along with gold coins left by the Celts. Clay pots from Roman times were also unearthed when the outlying village of Liederbach was being built.

On 19 September 1338, Dillendorf had its first documentary mention in a document of enfeoffment from the Count of Sponheim-Starkenburg and his wife Mechthild to Archbishop Baldwin of Trier for proven goodwill. In 1434, Dillendorf was named once again in a document of confirmation from the Margraves of Baden and Veldenz as Counts of Sponheim about their Electoral-Trier fief. Beginning in 1794, Dillendorf lay under French rule. In 1815 it was assigned to the Kingdom of Prussia at the Congress of Vienna. Since 1946, it has been part of the then newly founded state of Rhineland-Palatinate.

== Politics ==
=== Municipal council ===
The council is made up of 12 council members, who were elected at the municipal election held on 7 June 2009, and the honorary mayor as chairman.

=== Mayor ===
Dillendorf’s mayor is Renate Paschke.

=== Coat of arms ===
The German blazon reads: Durch grünen Wellenschrägbalken geteilt; oben von Gold und Blau geschacht, unten von Silber und Rot geschacht.

The municipality’s arms might in English heraldic language be described thus: A bend wavy vert between chequy of twenty argent and gules and chequy of twenty Or and azure.

The two “chequy” fields of gold and blue and of silver and red are drawn from the arms formerly borne by the two counties under whose lordship Dillendorf once lay, the County of Sponheim-Kreuznach (or the “Further” County of Sponheim) and the County of Sponheim-Starkenburg (or the “Hinder” County of Sponheim). The boundary between these mediaeval counties was the Kyrbach, which flows through the village. The wavy bend between the two chequy fields stands for this brook.

== Culture and sightseeing ==
=== Buildings ===
The following are listed buildings or sites in Rhineland-Palatinate’s Directory of Cultural Monuments:

- Auf dem Schloss 1 – timber-frame house, partly solid and slated, mansard roof, about 1800
- Auf dem Schloss 2 – timber-frame house, mansard roof, door marked 1815
- Hecker Straße – brick village fountain
- Kostenzer Straße 2 – estate complex; timber-frame house, plastered, earlier half of the 19th century, timber-frame stabling; whole complex of buildings
- Border stones, Brauschieder Forst – coat of arms, marked 1776
