= Beulich =

- Municipality
- Coat of arms

- Location of Beulich within Rhein-Hunsrück-Kreis district
- Interactive map of Beulich
- Location within Germany Location within Rhineland-Palatinate
- Coordinates: 50°10′29.14″N 7°27′10.79″E
- Country: Germany
- State: Rhineland-Palatinate
- District: Rhein-Hunsrück-Kreis
- Municipal assoc.: Hunsrück-Mittelrhein

Government
  - Mayor (2019–24): Werner Kremer

Area
  - Total: 13.28 km^{2} (5.13 sq mi)
- Elevation: 310 m (1,020 ft)

Population (2025-12-31)
  - Total: 478
  - Density: 36.0/km^{2} (93.2/sq mi)
- Time zone: UTC+01:00 (CET)
  - Summer (DST): UTC+02:00 (CEST)
- Postal codes: 56283
- Dialling codes: 06745
- Vehicle registration: SIM
- Website: www.ortsgemeinde-beulich.de

Beulich (German pronunciation: [ˈbɔʏlɪç]) is an Ortsgemeinde – a municipality belonging to a Verbandsgemeinde, a kind of collective municipality – in the Rhein-Hunsrück-Kreis (district) in Rhineland-Palatinate, Germany. It belongs to the Verbandsgemeinde Hunsrück-Mittelrhein, whose seat is in Emmelshausen.

== Geography ==
=== Location ===
The municipality lies on a high ridge in the northeast Hunsrück between the Ehrbach and Baybach valleys. It has an area of 1,310 ha and an elevation of 310 m above sea level.

=== Neighbouring municipalities ===
Beulich's neighbours are Morshausen, Mermuth and Gondershausen.

== History ==
In 1212, the church at Buliche had its first documentary mention. Beulich formed together with Morshausen a Vogtei, which was held in fief by the Lords of Boos von Waldeck. In the 14th century, there was a change in the feudal overlordship when it passed from the Counts of Sayn to the Electorate of Trier. In the 15th century, further feudal landholders cropped up alongside the family Boos von Waldeck. Beginning in 1794, Beulich lay under French rule. In 1815 it was assigned to the Kingdom of Prussia at the Congress of Vienna. Since 1946, it has been part of the then newly founded state of Rhineland-Palatinate. Flurbereinigung was undertaken between 1964 and 1967.

== Politics ==
=== Municipal council ===
The council is made up of 12 council members, who were elected by majority vote at the municipal election held on 7 June 2009, and the honorary mayor as chairman.

=== Mayor ===
Beulich's mayor is Werner Kremer.

=== Coat of arms ===
The German blazon reads: In dem von fünf Zinnen geteilten Schild oben heraldisch rechts in Silber ein schräglinkes grünes Eichenblatt, daneben heraldisch links ein schwarzer Rost. Unten drei schräg rechts aneinander gereihte rautenförmige silberne Schnallen.

The municipality's arms might in English heraldic language be described thus: Per fess embattled of five argent dexter an oakleaf bendwise vert and sinister a gridiron, the handle palewise to base, sable, and gules three arming buckles flory conjoined in bend, the tongues to dexter chief, of the first.

Above the “embattled” (that is, shaped like battlements on a castle wall) line of partition are two charges. The one on the dexter (armsbearer's right, viewer's left) side, the oakleaf, refers to the municipality's rich woodlands. The black gridiron on the sinister (armsbearer's left, viewer's right) side is Saint Lawrence's attribute, thus representing the church's patron saint. Below the line of partition are three buckles, the heraldic device formerly borne by the Lords of Boos von Waldeck, once the local landholders in Beulich.

== Culture and sightseeing ==
=== Buildings ===
The following are listed buildings or sites in Rhineland-Palatinate’s Directory of Cultural Monuments:

- Saint Lawrence’s and Saint Apollonia’s Catholic Parish Church (Pfarrkirche St. Laurentius und Apollonia), Rhein-Mosel-Straße – aisleless church, 1748, master builder Johann Neurohr, Romanesque west tower raised in 1838/1839; whole complex of buildings with rectory
- Brunnenweg 2 – Quereinhaus (a combination residential and commercial house divided for these two purposes down the middle, perpendicularly to the street), partly timber-frame, last third of the 18th century
- Parkstraße 14 – Quereinhaus, partly timber-frame slated, latter half of the 19th century; whole complex of buildings
- Parkstraße 17 – Quereinhaus, partly timber-frame or slated, early 19th century, well; whole complex of buildings
- Rhein-Mosel-Straße 31 – Quereinhaus, timber-frame slated, 19th century; whole complex of buildings with barn
- Rhein-Mosel-Straße 48 – quarrystone building, mid 19th century, timber-frame barn; whole complex of buildings
- Rhein-Mosel-Straße 50 – timber-frame Quereinhaus, late 18th century, barn 19th or 20th century; whole complex of buildings
- Römerstraße 12 – Quereinhaus, partly timber-frame, partly slated, 19th century, barn, well; whole complex of buildings
- Römerstraße/corner of Rhein-Mosel-Straße – warriors’ memorial; basalt block with relief
- On Landesstraße (State Road) 206 going towards Morshausen – Bildstock; possibly from the 18th century

Also worthy of note at the parish church are the Stumm organ, lavishly restored in the 1990s, and the community centre built in 1766. This is known as the Bagges, or Backes, both local forms of the German word Backhaus – “bakehouse”. It is the venue not only for community events of various kinds, but also the place where Beulich's municipal council meetings are regularly held. The council chamber is on the top floor.

=== Regular events ===
The traditional kermis is held each year in Beulich on the second weekend in August – at about the time of Saint Lawrence's Day (10 August).
