= Rhein-Hunsrück-Kreis =

Coordinates: 50°05′N 7°30′E

Rhein-Hunsrück
- District
- Flag Coat of arms
- Country: Germany
- State: Rhineland-Palatinate
- Capital: Simmern

Government
  - District admin.: Volker Boch

Area
  - Total: 990.70 km^{2} (382.51 sq mi)

Population (31 December 2025)
  - Total: 106,726
  - Density: 107.73/km^{2} (279.01/sq mi)
- Time zone: UTC+01:00 (CET)
  - Summer (DST): UTC+02:00 (CEST)
- Vehicle registration: SIM, GOA
- Website: www.kreis-sim.de

Rhein-Hunsrück-Kreis is a district (German: Kreis) in the middle of Rhineland-Palatinate, Germany. The neighbouring districts are (from north clockwise) Mayen-Koblenz, Rhein-Lahn, Mainz-Bingen, Bad Kreuznach, Birkenfeld, Bernkastel-Wittlich, Cochem-Zell.

== History ==
The district was created in 1969, when the districts of St. Goar and Simmern were merged. In 2014 it was expanded with the municipalities Lahr, Mörsdorf and Zilshausen, previously part of Cochem-Zell.

== Geography ==
The name of the district already mentions the two main geographic features of the district - the river Rhine which forms the boundary to the north-east and the hills of the Hunsrück cover most of the area of the district.

The Frankfurt-Hahn Airport is located in the district.

== Partnerships ==
In 1962, Simmern began a friendship pact with the French region Bourgogne, which was continued after the merging with the St. Goar. In 1985 a partnership was started with the district Nyaruguru (at that time called the municipality Rwamiko) in Rwanda, as part of the partnership of the Rhineland-Palatinate region with Rwanda. In 1999, a partnership with the Hungarian Zala County began.

== Coat of arms ==
The chequered bar in the top is taken from the coat of arms of the district Simmern, and stands for the Counts of Sponheim, who owned several estates in the district. The imperial eagle to the left was taken from the coat of arms of the St. Goar district, and represents the imperial cities Boppard and Oberwesel. To the right is the lion of the Electorate of the Palatinate.

== Towns and municipalities ==
Verband-free town: Boppard

Verbandsgemeinden
1.Hunsrück-Mittelrhein; 1. Badenhard; 2. Beulich; 3. Bickenbach; 4. Birkheim; 5. Damscheid; 6. Dörth; 7. Emmelshausen^{1,2}; 8. Gondershausen; 9. Halsenbach; 10. Hausbay; 11. Hungenroth; 12. Karbach; 13. Kratzenburg; 14. Laudert; 15. Leiningen; 16. Lingerhahn; 17. Maisborn; 18. Mermuth; 19. Morshausen; 20. Mühlpfad; 21. Ney; 22. Niederburg; 23. Niedert; 24. Norath; 25. Oberwesel^{2}; 26. Perscheid; 27. Pfalzfeld; 28. Sankt Goar^{2}; 29. Schwall; 30. Thörlingen; 31. Urbar; 32. Utzenhain; 33. Wiebelsheim	2.Kastellaun; 1. Alterkülz; 2. Bell; 3. Beltheim; 4. Braunshorn; 5. Buch; 6. Dommershausen; 7. Gödenroth; 8. Hasselbach; 9. Hollnich; 10. Kastellaun^{1,2}; 11. Korweiler; 12. Lahr; 13. Mastershausen; 14. Michelbach; 15. Mörsdorf; 16. Roth; 17. Spesenroth; 18. Uhler; 19. Zilshausen	3.Kirchberg; 1. Bärenbach; 2. Belg; 3. Büchenbeuren; 4. Dickenschied; 5. Dill; 6. Dillendorf; 7. Gehlweiler; 8. Gemünden; 9. Hahn; 10. Hecken; 11. Heinzenbach; 12. Henau; 13. Hirschfeld; 14. Kappel; 15. Kirchberg^{1,2}; 16. Kludenbach; 17. Laufersweiler; 18. Lautzenhausen; 19. Lindenschied; 20. Maitzborn; 21. Metzenhausen; 22. Nieder Kostenz; 23. Niedersohren; 24. Niederweiler; 25. Ober Kostenz; 26. Raversbeuren; 27. Reckershausen; 28. Rödelhausen; 29. Rödern; 30. Rohrbach; 31. Schlierschied; 32. Schwarzen; 33. Sohren; 34. Sohrschied; 35. Todenroth; 36. Unzenberg; 37. Wahlenau; 38. Womrath; 39. Woppenroth; 40. Würrich	4.Simmern-Rheinböllen; 1. Altweidelbach; 2. Argenthal; 3. Belgweiler; 4. Benzweiler; 5. Bergenhausen; 6. Biebern; 7. Bubach; 8. Budenbach; 9. Dichtelbach; 10. Ellern; 11. Erbach; 12. Fronhofen; 13. Holzbach; 14. Horn; 15. Keidelheim; 16. Kisselbach; 17. Klosterkumbd; 18. Külz; 19. Kümbdchen; 20. Laubach; 21. Liebshausen; 22. Mengerschied; 23. Mörschbach; 24. Mutterschied; 25. Nannhausen; 26. Neuerkirch; 27. Niederkumbd; 28. Ohlweiler; 29. Oppertshausen; 30. Pleizenhausen; 31. Ravengiersburg; 32. Rayerschied; 33. Reich; 34. Rheinböllen^{2}; 35. Riegenroth; 36. Riesweiler; 37. Sargenroth; 38. Schnorbach; 39. Schönborn; 40. Simmern^{1,2}; 41. Steinbach; 42. Tiefenbach; 43. Wahlbach; 44. Wüschheim
^{1}seat of the Verbandsgemeinde ;^{2}town

== Transport links ==
Verkehrsverbund Rhein-Mosel (VRM)

In the Rhein-Hunsrück district there are following railway lines:

- Linke Rheinstrecke, in service for passenger trains, long distance trains ICE, IC/EC and NJ as well as local trains RE2, RE17, RB26 and RB32
- Hunsrück Railway, (Boppard - Emmelshausen), passenger trains of line RB37
- Cross Hunsrück railway, (Langenlonsheim - Simmern - Hermeskeil), out of service

The Rhein-Hunsrück district is located in the area of the transport association Verkehrsverbund Rhein-Mosel (VRM).
