= Kirchberg (Verbandsgemeinde) =

Municipality in Rhineland-Palatinate, Germany

Kirchberg (Hunsrück)
- Verbandsgemeinde
- Coat of arms

- Location of Kirchberg (Hunsrück) within Rhein-Hunsrück-Kreis district
- Interactive map of Kirchberg (Hunsrück)
- Location within Germany Location within Rhineland-Palatinate
- Coordinates: 49°57′N 7°24′E
- Country: Germany
- State: Rhineland-Palatinate
- District: Rhein-Hunsrück-Kreis
- Seat: Kirchberg
- Subdivisions: 40 municipalities

Area
  - Total: 227.92 km^{2} (88.00 sq mi)

Population (2025-12-31)
  - Total: 20,822
  - Density: 91.357/km^{2} (236.61/sq mi)
- Time zone: UTC+01:00 (CET)
  - Summer (DST): UTC+02:00 (CEST)
- Website: www.kirchberg-hunsrueck.de

Kirchberg (Hunsrück) is a Verbandsgemeinde ("collective municipality") in the Rhein-Hunsrück district, in Rhineland-Palatinate, Germany. Its seat is in Kirchberg.

The Verbandsgemeinde Kirchberg (Hunsrück) consists of the following Ortsgemeinden ("local municipalities"):

1. Bärenbach
2. Belg
3. Büchenbeuren
4. Dickenschied
5. Dill
6. Dillendorf
7. Gehlweiler
8. Gemünden
9. Hahn
10. Hecken
11. Heinzenbach
12. Henau
13. Hirschfeld
14. Kappel
15. Kirchberg
16. Kludenbach
17. Laufersweiler
18. Lautzenhausen
19. Lindenschied
20. Maitzborn
21. Metzenhausen
22. Nieder Kostenz
23. Niedersohren
24. Niederweiler
25. Ober Kostenz
26. Raversbeuren
27. Reckershausen
28. Rödelhausen
29. Rödern
30. Rohrbach
31. Schlierschied
32. Schwarzen
33. Sohren
34. Sohrschied
35. Todenroth
36. Unzenberg
37. Wahlenau
38. Womrath
39. Woppenroth
40. Würrich
