= Lautzenhausen =

- Municipality
- Coat of arms

- Location of Lautzenhausen within Rhein-Hunsrück-Kreis district
- Interactive map of Lautzenhausen
- Location within Germany Location within Rhineland-Palatinate
- Coordinates: 49°56′17″N 7°16′23″E
- Country: Germany
- State: Rhineland-Palatinate
- District: Rhein-Hunsrück-Kreis
- Municipal assoc.: Kirchberg

Government
  - Mayor (2019–24): Corina Velten

Area
  - Total: 5.00 km^{2} (1.93 sq mi)
- Elevation: 470 m (1,540 ft)

Population (2025-12-31)
  - Total: 1,189
  - Density: 238/km^{2} (616/sq mi)
- Time zone: UTC+01:00 (CET)
  - Summer (DST): UTC+02:00 (CEST)
- Postal codes: 55483
- Dialling codes: 06543
- Vehicle registration: SIM
- Website: www.lautzenhausen-hunsrueck.de

Lautzenhausen is an Ortsgemeinde – a municipality belonging to a Verbandsgemeinde, a kind of collective municipality – in the Rhein-Hunsrück-Kreis (district) in Rhineland-Palatinate, Germany. It belongs to the Verbandsgemeinde of Kirchberg, whose seat is in the like-named town.

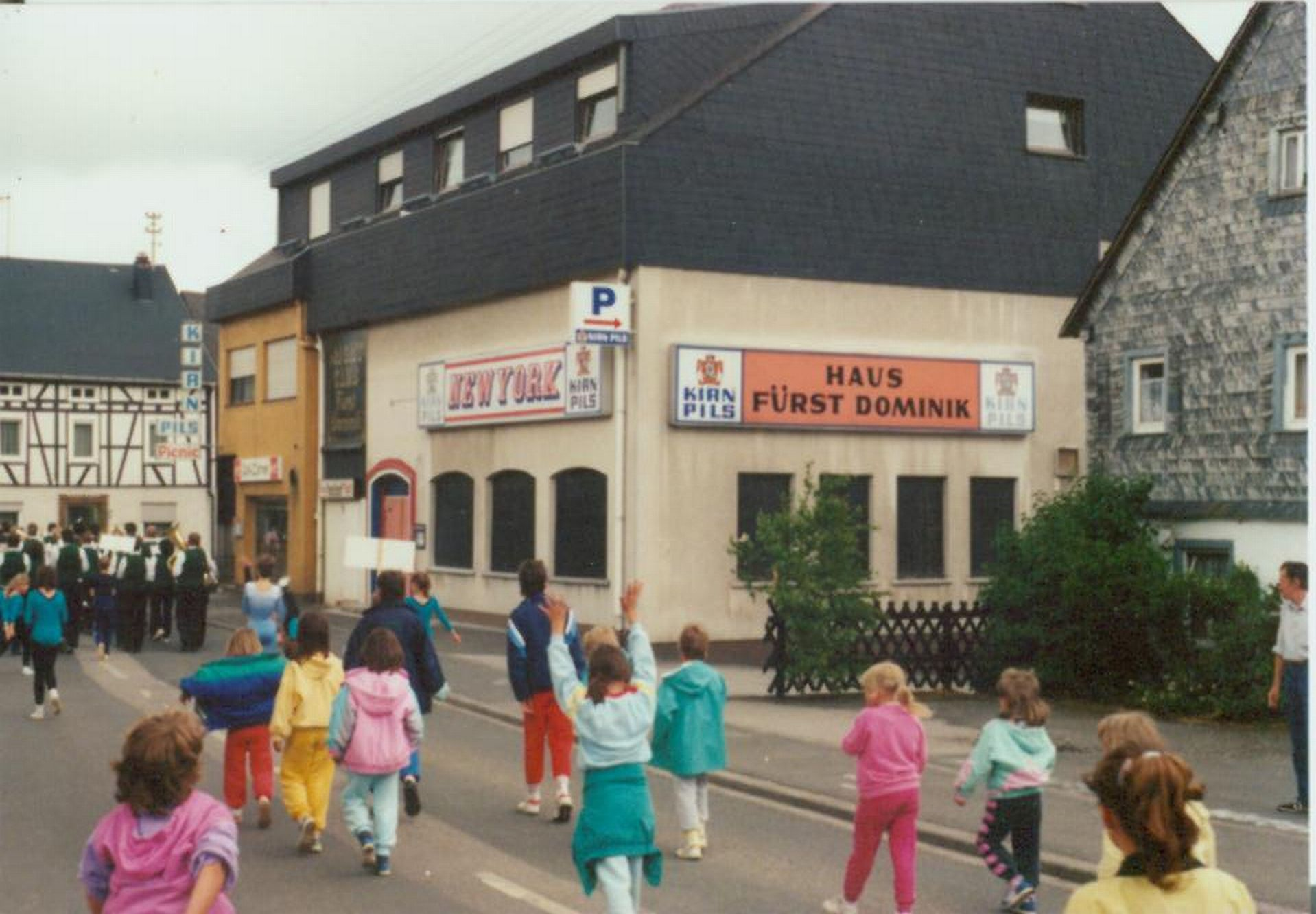
Former Prince Dominik House, a former brothel

== Geography ==
=== Location ===
The municipality of Lautzenhausen lies on a high plateau in the Hunsrück. Great parts of the municipal area are covered by Frankfurt-Hahn Airport. Lautzenhausen is linked to the long-distance road network by Bundesstraße 50. Lautzenhausen lies roughly 10 km (6 mi) east-southeast of the Moselle at Starkenburg and just under 18 km (11 mi) west-southwest of Simmern. The municipal area measures 495 hectares (1,220 acres).

== History ==
Archaeological finds bear witness to a Roman presence in the area. In 1260, Lautzenhausen had its first documentary mention. Beginning in 1794, Lautzenhausen lay under French rule. In 1814 it was assigned to the Kingdom of Prussia at the Congress of Vienna. Since 1946, it has been part of the then newly founded state of Rhineland-Palatinate.

Until the 1950s, the village was characterized by agriculture. This changed when the air base, now a civil airport, was built. It was first planned by the French in 1946, but was, however, subsequently built by the Americans. They named it "Hahn Air Base" after nearby Hahn because, as a local joke had it, they could not pronounce "Lautzenhausen". A somewhat likelier explanation is that a great part of the air base lay within Hahn's limits, as can be seen in some plans from the time it was built. Since the base's main gate stood right at the entrance to Lautzenhausen, a cutoff point arose right in the municipality between military and civilian zones. For the municipality, it was a divide that lasted decades. Buildings, some of which had been used for farming, were converted, and new buildings were added. They eventually housed hotels, inns, bars, and businesses associated with a red-light district, so that the G.I.'s from the base could be offered something by way of recreation during their off-duty time.

== Politics ==
=== Municipal council ===
The council is made up of 8 council members, who were elected by majority vote at the municipal election held on 7 June 2009, and the honorary mayor as chairman.

=== Mayor ===
Lautzenhausen's mayor is Corina Velten.

=== Coat of arms ===
The German blazon reads: Unter blauem Schildhaupt, darin eine silberne Doppelschwinge, blau-gold geschachtes Schild mit überhöhter, eingebogener blauer Spitze, darin ein silberner Brunnen.

The municipality's arms might in English heraldic language be described thus: Tierced in mantle, each side chequy Or and azure, in base azure a village fountain with two spouts argent, on a chief of the second a pair of wings conjoined of the third.

The "chequy" pattern and the predominant tinctures (Or and azure, that is, gold and blue) refer to the former lordly landholders in the area, the Counts of Sponheim (from the "Further" County, in this case). For decades, Lautzenhausen was in close association with the United States Air Force's Hahn Air Base, which held considerable economic importance to the municipality. Standing for this is the charge on the chief, a pair of wings. In base is a stylized representation of a long vanished village fountain, meant to recall the community's focal point, and by extension, the sense of community that is so basic to village life.

== Culture and sightseeing ==
=== Buildings ===
The following are listed buildings or sites in Rhineland-Palatinate's Directory of Cultural Monuments:

- Büchenbeurener Straße 11 – former school (?); building with hipped roof and knee wall, partly slated, latter half of the 19th century
- Hauptstraße 22 – L-shaped estate complex, whole complex of buildings; timber-frame house, plastered or slated, 18th or 19th century, timber-frame barn

=== Lautzenhausen in film ===
In 1960 and 1961, the film Black Gravel (Schwarzer Kies) directed by Helmut Käutner, was shot in Lautzenhausen. The film tells the story of a man named Robert Neidhardt (Helmut Wildt), a gravel dealer in the fictitious village of "Sohnen", who, on the sly, sells gravel to smaller companies which was meant for building the runway at the nearby air base. He must flee when the police find out about his unlawful deals, and this leads to great misfortune for himself as well as others.

The use of the German word schwarz ("black") in the title does not refer to the gravel's colour, but rather imparts the meaning of illegality, as in "black market".
