= Maitzborn =

- Municipality
- Coat of arms

- Location of Maitzborn within Rhein-Hunsrück-Kreis district
- Interactive map of Maitzborn
- Location within Germany Location within Rhineland-Palatinate
- Coordinates: 49°56′05″N 7°26′06″E
- Country: Germany
- State: Rhineland-Palatinate
- District: Rhein-Hunsrück-Kreis
- Municipal assoc.: Kirchberg

Government
  - Mayor (2019–24): Renate Förster-Hoemberg

Area
  - Total: 3.15 km^{2} (1.22 sq mi)
- Elevation: 387 m (1,270 ft)

Population (2025-12-31)
  - Total: 109
  - Density: 34.6/km^{2} (89.6/sq mi)
- Time zone: UTC+01:00 (CET)
  - Summer (DST): UTC+02:00 (CEST)
- Postal codes: 55481
- Dialling codes: 06763
- Vehicle registration: SIM

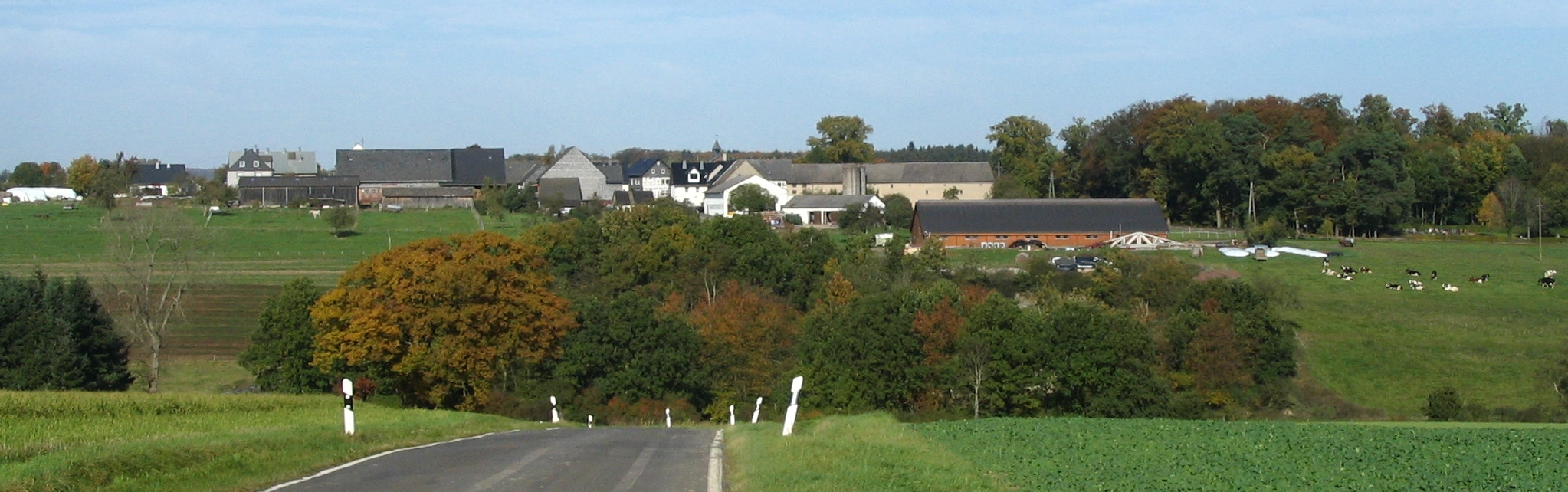
Maitzborn seen from the south

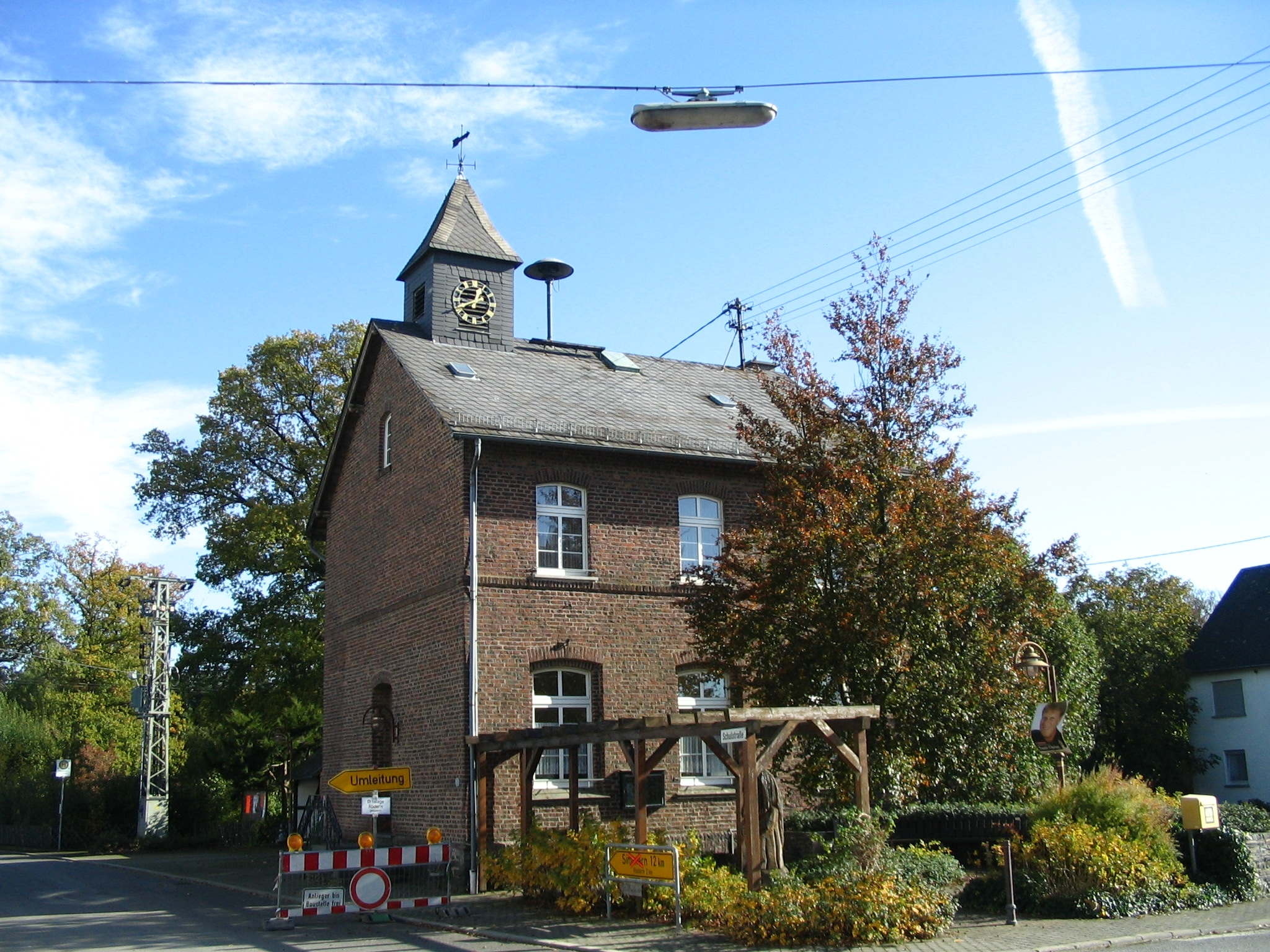
Municipal building in the village centre

Maitzborn is an Ortsgemeinde – a municipality belonging to a Verbandsgemeinde, a kind of collective municipality – in the Rhein-Hunsrück-Kreis (district) in Rhineland-Palatinate, Germany. It belongs to the Verbandsgemeinde of Kirchberg, whose seat is in the like-named town.

== Geography ==
=== Location ===
The municipality lies in the central Hunsrück near the town of Kirchberg. East of the village lies the Kauerbach valley, while running west of the village is Bundesstraße 421. Maitzborn's municipal area measures 315 ha, of which 110 ha is wooded.

== History ==
Maitzborn is believed to have been settled in Frankish times. In 1304, it had its first documentary mention in the Sponheimisches Gefälleregister, a taxation register kept by the County of Sponheim. Beginning in 1794, Maitzborn lay under French rule. In 1815 it was assigned to the Kingdom of Prussia at the Congress of Vienna. Since 1946, it has been part of the then newly founded state of Rhineland-Palatinate.

In Maitzborn, whose name might refer to a place of sacrifice, more than 40 barrows have been found. They can be found in the east of the municipal area.

== Politics ==
=== Municipal council ===
The council is made up of 6 council members, who were elected by majority vote at the municipal election held on 7 June 2009, and the honorary mayor as chairman.

=== Mayor ===
Maitzborn's mayor is Renate Förster-Hoemberg.

=== Coat of arms ===
The German blazon reads: Unten in zwei Reihen Blau/Gold geschachtetem Schildhaupt rote Schrägleiste in Gold, begleitet oben von einer roten Garbe, unten von einem roten Brunnen.

The municipality's arms might in English heraldic language be described thus: Or a bend between a fountain and a garb, all gules, and a chief countercompony azure and of the first.

The composition of charges in the arms was determined by the municipality's historical development and the origin of its name. The tinctures, too, reflect the municipality's history. The chief countercompony (that is, with two chequered rows) refers to the arms borne until the 15th century by the “Further” County of Sponheim, which were “chequy” (that is, with the escutcheon’s whole field chequered) in these two tinctures (blue and gold). As of the 15th century, the village was administered by Electoral Palatinate, the Duchy of Palatinate-Simmern and the Margraviate of Baden. The red and gold in the main field come from the arms formerly borne by the Margraviate of Baden, which held Maitzborn from 1708 to 1794. The fountain on the dexter (armsbearer’s right, viewer’s left) side stands for the ones formerly found on the Badish estate, and which can also be taken as a canting charge for the village’s name ending, —born, which means “fountain” (although, as can be seen in the German blazon, the usual German word is Brunnen). The garb (wheat sheaf) on the sinister (armsbearer's left, viewer's right) side stands for the municipality's important agricultural sector.

== Economy and infrastructure ==
The municipality's economy is based mainly on agriculture.
