= Niedersohren =

- Municipality
- Coat of arms

- Location of Niedersohren within Rhein-Hunsrück-Kreis district
- Interactive map of Niedersohren
- Location within Germany Location within Rhineland-Palatinate
- Coordinates: 49°55′43″N 7°19′54″E
- Country: Germany
- State: Rhineland-Palatinate
- District: Rhein-Hunsrück-Kreis
- Municipal assoc.: Kirchberg

Government
  - Mayor (2019–24): Severin Ochs

Area
  - Total: 3.90 km^{2} (1.51 sq mi)
- Elevation: 380 m (1,250 ft)

Population (2025-12-31)
  - Total: 435
  - Density: 112/km^{2} (289/sq mi)
- Time zone: UTC+01:00 (CET)
  - Summer (DST): UTC+02:00 (CEST)
- Postal codes: 55487
- Dialling codes: 06543
- Vehicle registration: SIM

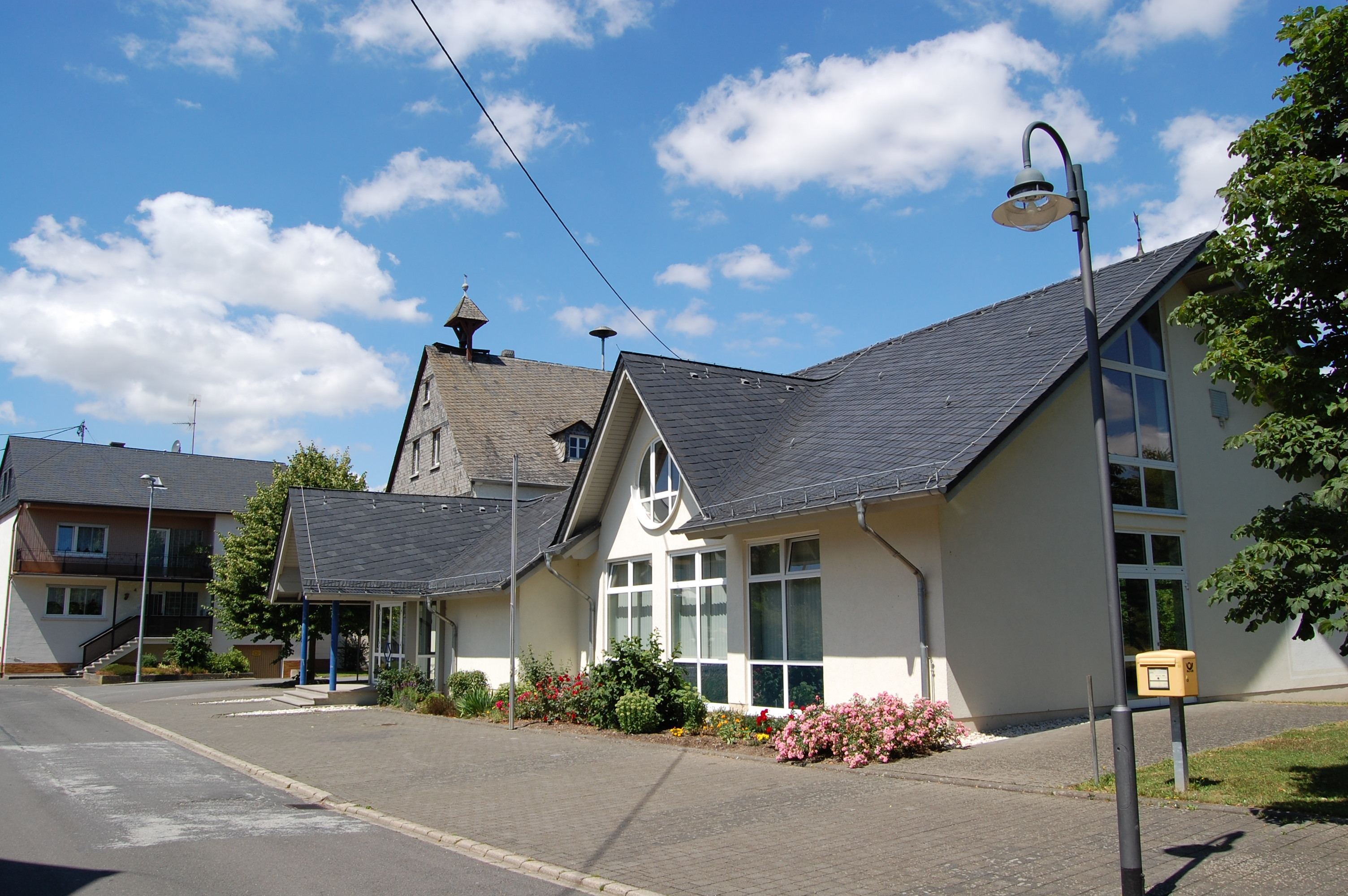
Municipal building in the village centre

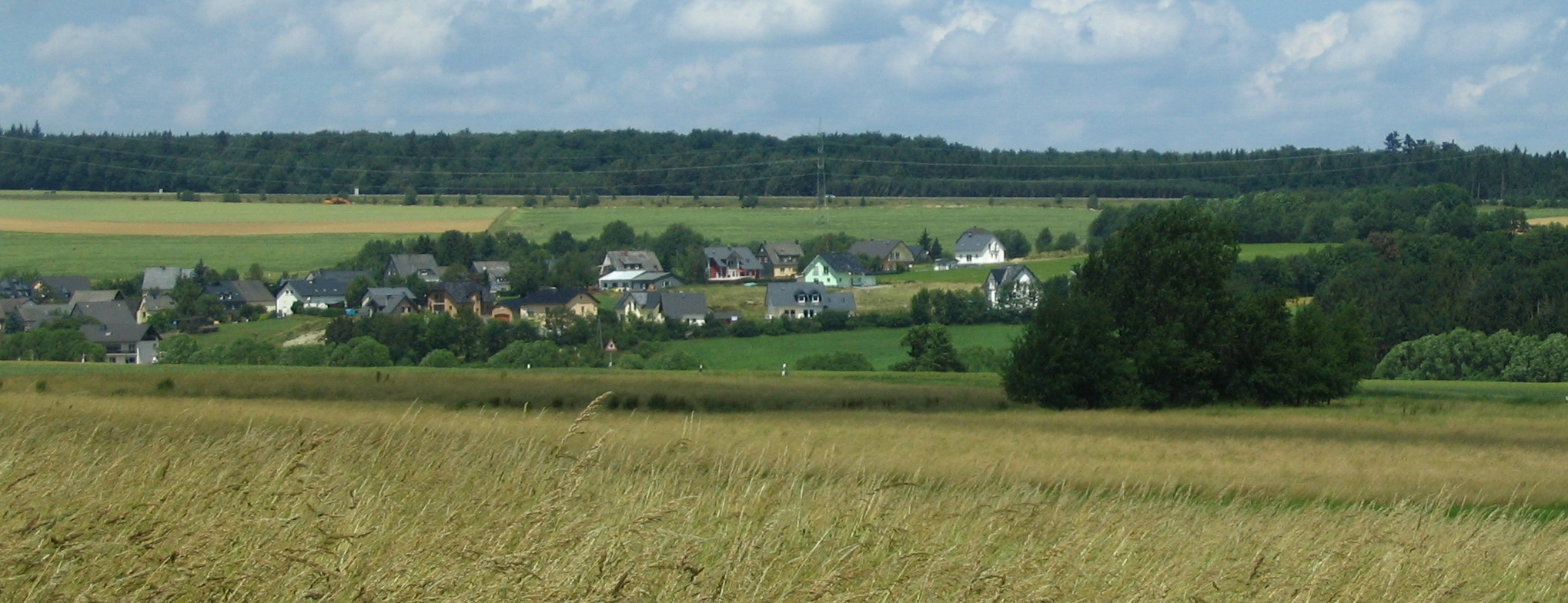
View from the southwest

Niedersohren is an Ortsgemeinde – a municipality belonging to a Verbandsgemeinde, a kind of collective municipality – in the Rhein-Hunsrück-Kreis (district) in Rhineland-Palatinate, Germany. It belongs to the Verbandsgemeinde of Kirchberg, whose seat is in the like-named town.

== Geography ==
=== Location ===
The municipality lies in the central Hunsrück in the valley of the Sohrbach. The municipal area measures 3.90 km^{2}, 0.89 km^{2} of which is wooded.

North of the village runs Bundesstraße 50, while to the south runs the historical Via Ausonia, a Roman road (called the Ausoniusstraße in German). Four kilometres northwest of Niedersohren lies Frankfurt-Hahn Airport. Niedersohren lies roughly 4 km southwest of Rhineland-Palatinate's geographical midpoint. The cities of Mainz, Koblenz and Trier are more or less equidistant from Niedersohren.

== History ==
Bearing witness to Roman settlement are graves found on the Via Ausonia and near the Annahof, where in 1884 fragments of a Roman grave memorial bearing a scene from daily life, and a cube-shaped quarrystone from the frieze of a second grave were unearthed. These are now found in the Museum Bonn.

In 1301, King Albrecht enfeoffed Eberhard von Sponheim with the village. The Counts of Sponheim held an estate in Niedersohren

In the 18th century, the Margrave of Baden was the landholder. Beginning in 1794, Niedersohren lay under French rule. In 1815 it was assigned to the Kingdom of Prussia at the Congress of Vienna. Since 1946, it has been part of the then newly founded state of Rhineland-Palatinate.

== Politics ==
=== Municipal council ===
The council is made up of 8 council members, who were elected by majority vote at the municipal election held on 7 June 2009, and the honorary mayor as chairman.

=== Mayor ===
Niedersohren's mayor is Severin Ochs.

=== Coat of arms ===
The German blazon reads: Gespalten durch eine eingebogene, gestürzte schwarze Spitze, darin ein rotbewehrter und- gezungter Adler, vorne in silber über einer blauen Schale ein blauer Krug, hinten in gold ein roter Schrägrechtsbalken.

The municipality's arms might in English heraldic language be described thus: Tierced in mantle reversed, argent an urn and a bowl in pale azure, sable an eagle displayed Or, armed and langued gules and Or a bend of the fifth.

Niedersohren in the Pflege (literally “care”, but actually a local geopolitical unit) of Sohren was a royal estate, and thus the eagle is borne as a charge. In 1301, Niedersohren passed as an Imperial fief to the Counts of Sponheim, after whom came their heirs, the Margraves of Baden and the Counts of Veldenz. After the 1707 partition, the Margraves of Baden were the only landholders. The red bend (slanted stripe) in the gold field on the sinister (armsbearer's left, viewer's right) side refers to them. The two vessels on the dexter (armsbearer's right, viewer's left) side are from the Hunsrück-Eifel Culture and were recovered from a barrow in the municipal forest, district 6.

== Culture and sightseeing ==
=== Buildings ===
The following are listed buildings or sites in Rhineland-Palatinate’s Directory of Cultural Monuments:

- Schulstraße 8 – estate complex along the street; timber-frame building, late 19th century, timber-frame stable, partly solid; whole complex of buildings
- Sohrener Weg 4 – L-shaped estate, timber-frame; whole complex of buildings
- Niedersohrener Hof, east of Niedersohren – building with hipped roof; whole complex of buildings

==== Other sites ====
Standing in the village centre is the Altes Backes (“Old Bakehouse”) which now houses the volunteer fire brigade. To its right stands a newer building, the municipal building.

Some 2 km from the village centre, between Niedersohren and Dill, is found a replica of a watchtower from Roman times, as well as a shelter cabin with “Roman games”. Looking from the Roman tower, there is a good view of the Idarkopf (one of the Hunsrück's highest mountains) and Frankfurt-Hahn Airport.

=== Via Ausonia ===
Running by the replica watchtower and the shelter cabin is the Via Ausonia (locally, the Ausoniusstraße). This road, or rather path, was laid out by the Romans and saw heavy use in antiquity. The Via Ausonia leads from Bingen to Trier.

=== Sport ===
The Niedersohren sport club has been in existence since 1921. The sporting ground lies right on Kreisstraße (District Road) 2, going towards Sohren. There is also a youth football pitch.

There is a playing collective between the two sport clubs TUS Sohren and TUS Büchenbeuren.

=== Regular events ===
- Events staged by the volunteer fire brigade and the promotional association
  - 1 May: Fire Brigade Day and Open-Door Day
- Events staged by the Niedersohren parents’ initiative
  - Kinderfastnacht (“Children’s Fastnacht”, on Shrove Tuesday)
  - Nikolausfeier (on the first Saturday in December)
  - Theatre Evening (early September)
- Events staged by SV Niedersohren
  - Carnival session on the Saturday evening before Rosenmontag (Shrove Monday)
  - Après-Ski, alternating with Caribbean Night once a year on a Saturday evening in autumn.
