= Rödern =

- Municipality
- Coat of arms

- Location of Rödern within Rhein-Hunsrück-Kreis district
- Interactive map of Rödern
- Location within Germany Location within Rhineland-Palatinate
- Coordinates: 49°56′53″N 7°26′57″E
- Country: Germany
- State: Rhineland-Palatinate
- District: Rhein-Hunsrück-Kreis
- Municipal assoc.: Kirchberg

Government
  - Mayor (2019–24): Josef Winn

Area
  - Total: 2.72 km^{2} (1.05 sq mi)
- Elevation: 360 m (1,180 ft)

Population (2025-12-31)
  - Total: 194
  - Density: 71.3/km^{2} (185/sq mi)
- Time zone: UTC+01:00 (CET)
  - Summer (DST): UTC+02:00 (CEST)
- Postal codes: 55481
- Dialling codes: 06763
- Vehicle registration: SIM

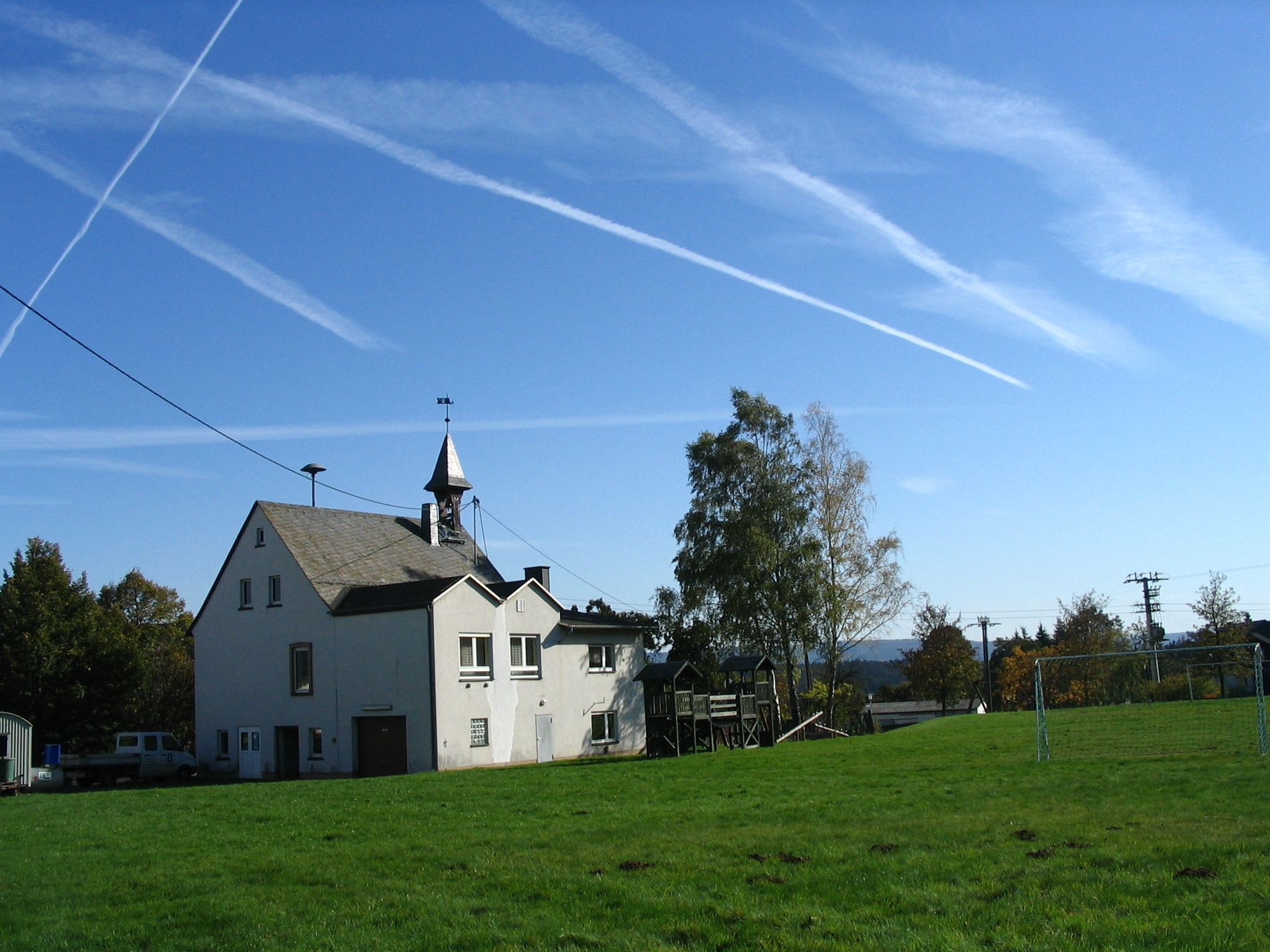
Rödern municipal building and playground in the village centre

Rödern is an Ortsgemeinde – a municipality belonging to a Verbandsgemeinde, a kind of collective municipality – in the Rhein-Hunsrück-Kreis (district) in Rhineland-Palatinate, Germany. It belongs to the Verbandsgemeinde of Kirchberg, whose seat is in the town of Kirchberg.

== Geography ==
=== Location ===
The municipality lies in the central Hunsrück, roughly 3 km east of Kirchberg, which lies on a rise, and 6 km west-southwest of Simmern. To the east is the Kauerbach valley. The municipal area measures 2.72 km^{2}, of which 1.27 km^{2} is wooded.

== History ==
In Sections 97 and 98 of the Hallschied State Forest are prehistoric and protohistoric barrows, bearing witness to early settlers in the area.

Around 1250 or 1260, Rödern had its first documentary mention in the later of the enfeoffment books kept by Werner II of Bolanden. An estate at Rödern was transferred in 1338 by Count Johann of Sponheim-Starkenburg to Archbishop of Trier Baldwin as a fief. Later, feudal rights were held by the Junkers of Koppenstein, to whom the Lötscherhof (estate), formerly held by the Counts of Sponheim, also belonged as a fief, granted for military service. The Lötschermühle (mill) is nowadays in private ownership.

Rödern was mentioned as Imzinruden ("Immo’s clearing") in 1317. In the 18th century, the village passed to the Margraves of Baden. Beginning in 1794, Rödern was under French rule. In 1815, it was assigned to the Kingdom of Prussia at the Congress of Vienna. Since 1946, it has been part of the then newly founded state of Rhineland-Palatinate.

== Politics ==
=== Municipal council ===
The council is made up of six council members, who were elected by majority vote at the municipal election held on 7 June 2009, and the honorary mayor as chairman.

=== Mayor ===
Rödern's mayor is Josef Winn, and his deputy is Markus Nick.

=== Coat of arms ===
The German blazon reads: In Blau eine eingebogene goldene Spitze, darin ein schwarzes Mühlrad. Vorn gestürzt und schräg gekreuzt ein silberner Spaten und eine silberne Rodehacke. Hinten ein silberner Rabe.

The municipality's arms might in English heraldic language be described thus: "Tierced in mantle dexter azure a spade and a clearing hoe per saltire argent, sinister azure a raven of the second, and in base Or a waterwheel spoked of eight sable."

The tinctures or and azure (gold and blue) are a reference to the village's former allegiance to the "Further" County of Sponheim; it lay in the Amt of Kirchberg. The crossed tools recall the village's founding as a clearing settlement and also suggest the municipality's name: "clearing" is Rodung in German, and the verb "clear" is roden; the clearing hoe is a Rodehacke in German. The silver raven refers to the Junkers of Koppenstein, who held the tithes and the fief at the Lötscher Mühle (mill). The waterwheel refers to the two important mills within municipal limits, the aforesaid Lötscher Mühle and also the Schneidemühl.

== Economy and infrastructure ==
=== Transport ===
Rödern is in the area served by the Verkehrsverbund Rhein-Mosel (Rhine-Moselle Transport Association). Bus routes 644, 661 and 664 run by the Rhein-Mosel Verkehrsgesellschaft link the village to the nearby towns of Kirchberg and Simmern. The nearest railway station with passenger service is Kirn on the Nahe Valley Railway (Nahetalbahn), 25 km to the south.

Along the municipality's northern outskirts, about a kilometre from the village centre, runs the well constructed Bundesstraße 50 between Bitburg and Bingen, by which the nearest Autobahn interchange, at Rheinböllen, on the A 61, can be reached, 20 km to the east.
