= Sohrschied =

- Municipality
- Coat of arms

- Location of Sohrschied within Rhein-Hunsrück-Kreis district
- Interactive map of Sohrschied
- Location within Germany Location within Rhineland-Palatinate
- Coordinates: 49°54′18″N 7°21′22″E
- Country: Germany
- State: Rhineland-Palatinate
- District: Rhein-Hunsrück-Kreis
- Municipal assoc.: Kirchberg

Government
  - Mayor (2019–24): Sonja Renzler

Area
  - Total: 4.46 km^{2} (1.72 sq mi)
- Elevation: 370 m (1,210 ft)

Population (2025-12-31)
  - Total: 108
  - Density: 24.2/km^{2} (62.7/sq mi)
- Time zone: UTC+01:00 (CET)
  - Summer (DST): UTC+02:00 (CEST)
- Postal codes: 55487
- Dialling codes: 06763
- Vehicle registration: SIM
- Website: www.sohrschied.de

Sohrschied is an Ortsgemeinde – a municipality belonging to a Verbandsgemeinde, a kind of collective municipality – in the Rhein-Hunsrück-Kreis (district) in Rhineland-Palatinate, Germany. It belongs to the Verbandsgemeinde of Kirchberg, whose seat is in the like-named town.

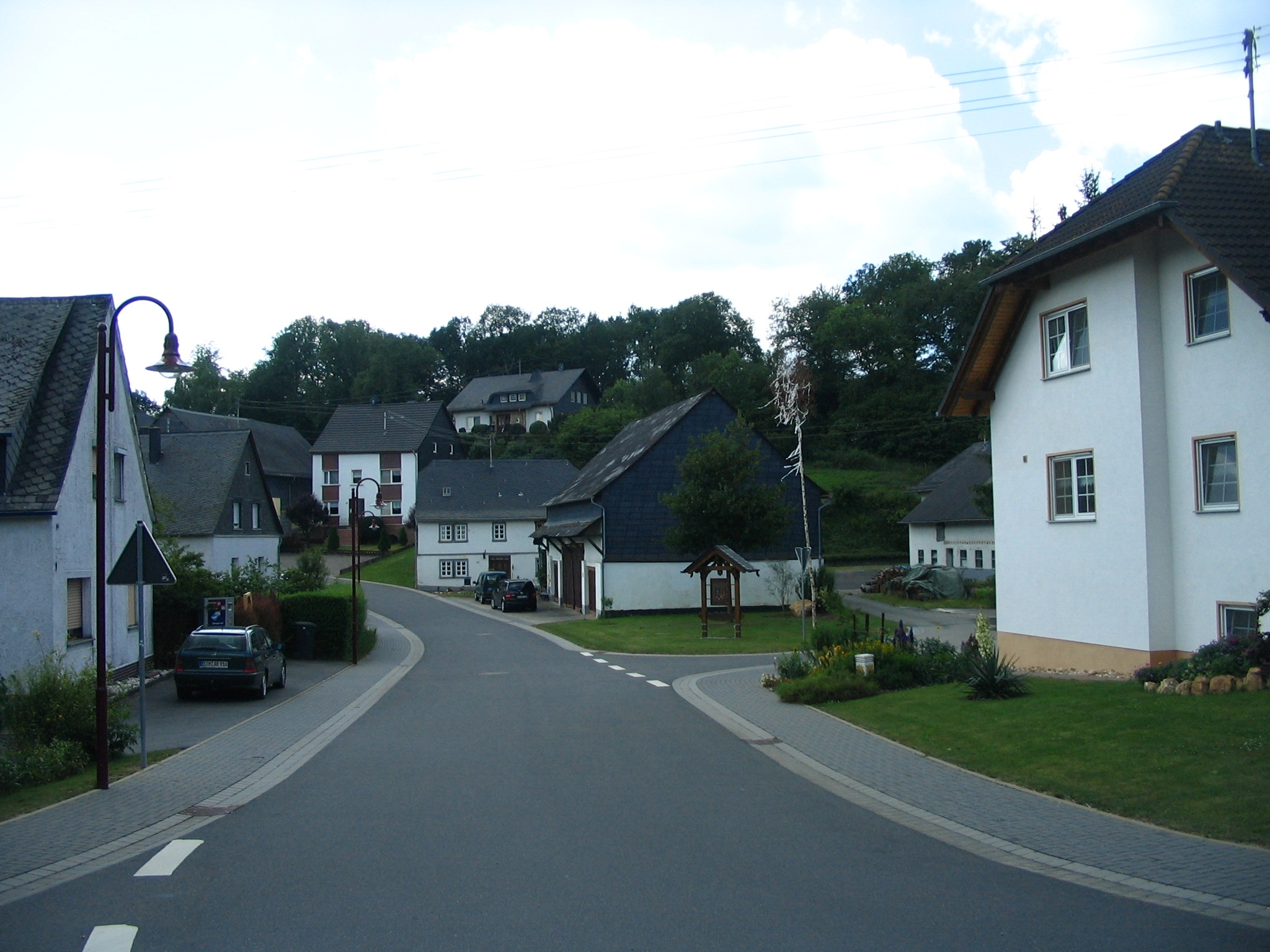
Village centre

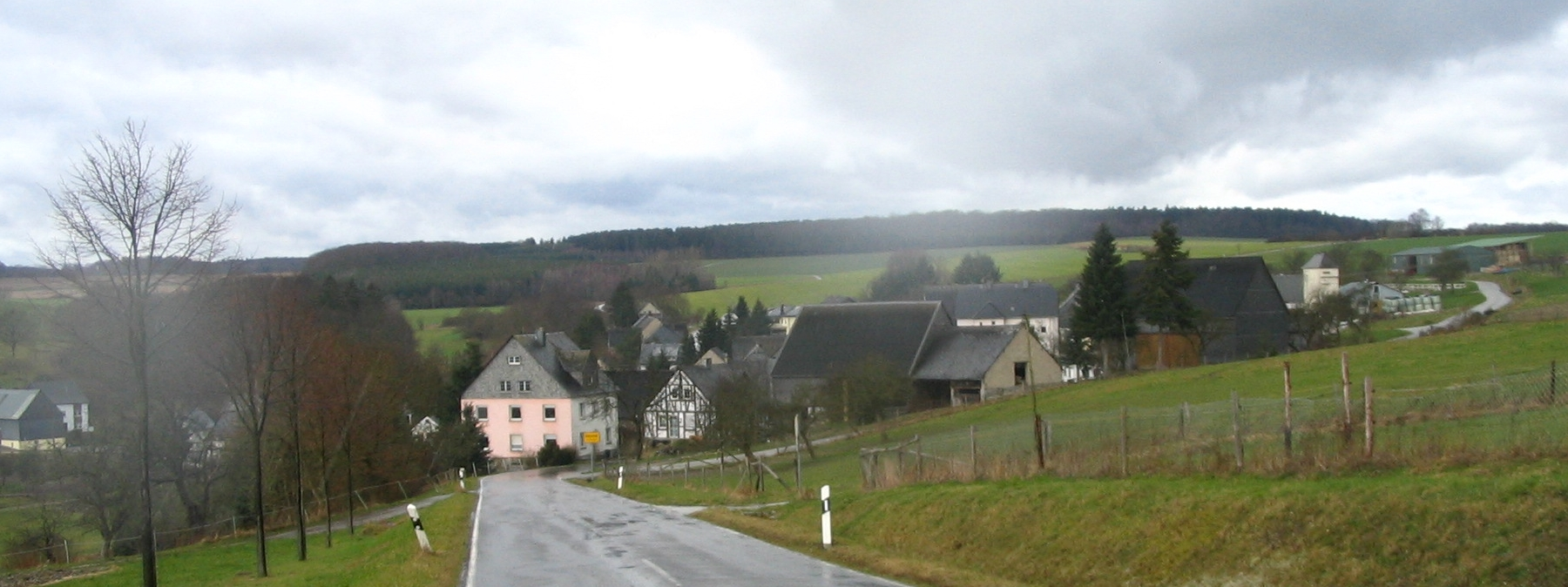
Sohrschied seen from the east

== Geography ==
=== Location ===
The municipality lies in the central Hunsrück on the edge of the Kyrbach valley on both sides of the Aubach. Sohrschied lies roughly 6 km southwest of Kirchberg and 7 km southeast of Frankfurt-Hahn Airport.

== History ==
Early habitation is witnessed by several archaeological finds. A quern-stone from the Iron Age was found near the Sohrbach bridge west of Kreisstraße (District Road) 3. There is an early Roman barrow southwest of the village in the cadastral area known as “Im Haag”. This yielded grave goods that are now in the Bonn Museum. In two other cadastral areas, “Auf Weiler” and “Höll”, remnants of Roman walls have been unearthed.

In 1428, Sohrschied had its first documentary mention in a will written by Count Johann V of Sponheim-Starkenburg. The Lordship of Koppenstein held an estate in the village. The feudal lords were the Wildbergs. Southeast of the village, border stones from 1787 can be found on a juniper heath.

Sohrschied belonged to the high court (that is, blood court) of Rhaunen, held by the Waldgraves and Rhinegraves. From the 16th century, the village was under the lordship of the “Hinder” County of Sponheim. Beginning in 1794, Sohrschied lay under French rule. In 1815 it was assigned to the Kingdom of Prussia at the Congress of Vienna. Since 1946, it has been part of the then newly founded state of Rhineland-Palatinate.

== Politics ==
=== Municipal council ===
The council is made up of 6 council members, who were elected by majority vote at the municipal election held on 7 June 2009, and the honorary mayor as chairman.

=== Mayor ===
Sohrschied’s mayor is Sonja Renzler.

=== Coat of arms ===
The German blazon reads: Gespalten von Blau und Gold durch eine rot-silber geschachte erniedrigte eingeschweifte Spitze, vorn eine silberne heraldische Lilie, hinten ein blaubewehrter und -gezungter roter Löwe in Gold.

The municipality’s arms might in English heraldic language be described thus: Tierced in mantle, dexter azure a fleur-de-lis argent, sinister Or a lion rampant gules armed and langued of the first, and in base chequy of twelve of the third and second.

The lion refers to the village’s former status as part of the Waldgraves’ and Rhinegraves’ high court. The lily refers to Saint Mary, thus representing the chapel’s patron saint. The “chequy” pattern a reference to the village’s former allegiance to the “Hinder” County of Sponheim, which began in the 16th century.

== Culture and sightseeing ==
=== Buildings ===
The following are listed buildings or sites in Rhineland-Palatinate’s Directory of Cultural Monuments:

- Hauptstraße 4 – three-floor timber-frame house, partly solid or slated, marked 1839; whole complex of buildings with barn
- Hauptstraße 14 – building with half-hipped roof, timber framing plastered, first third of the 19th century
- Hauptstraße/corner of Dillerweg – bakehouse; one-floor timber-frame house, marked 1930, essentially possibly older

== Clubs ==
- Volunteer fire brigade
- Verein Berufliches und Soziales Lernen im Hunsrück ("Club for Professional and Social Learning in the Hunsrück")
