= Reckershausen =

- Municipality
- Coat of arms

- Location of Reckershausen within Rhein-Hunsrück-Kreis district
- Interactive map of Reckershausen
- Location within Germany Location within Rhineland-Palatinate
- Coordinates: 49°59′1″N 7°24′10″E
- Country: Germany
- State: Rhineland-Palatinate
- District: Rhein-Hunsrück-Kreis
- Municipal assoc.: Kirchberg

Government
  - Mayor (2019–24): Christian Gehre (Ind.)

Area
  - Total: 8.19 km^{2} (3.16 sq mi)
- Elevation: 410 m (1,350 ft)

Population (2025-12-31)
  - Total: 390
  - Density: 48/km^{2} (120/sq mi)
- Time zone: UTC+01:00 (CET)
  - Summer (DST): UTC+02:00 (CEST)
- Postal codes: 55481
- Dialling codes: 06763
- Vehicle registration: SIM
- Website: www.reckershausen.de

Reckershausen is an Ortsgemeinde – a municipality belonging to a Verbandsgemeinde, a kind of collective municipality – in the Rhein-Hunsrück-Kreis (district) in Rhineland-Palatinate, Germany. It belongs to the Verbandsgemeinde of Kirchberg, whose seat is in the like-named town.

== Geography ==
=== Location ===
The municipality lies in the Hunsrück and encompasses an area of 8.19 km², of which 4.52 km² is wooded. The rural residential community lies roughly 4 km north of Kirchberg.

== History ==
In 1072, Reckershausen had its first documentary mention. Reckershausen was an area subject to the provost's office at Ravengiersburg Monastery. When the monastery was dissolved by the Dukes of Palatinate-Simmern in 1566, the Reformation was introduced.

In 1672 the village passed to Electoral Palatinate. Beginning in 1794, Reckershausen lay under French rule. In 1815 it was assigned to the Kingdom of Prussia at the Congress of Vienna. Since 1946, it has been part of the then newly founded state of Rhineland-Palatinate.

== Politics ==
=== Municipal council ===
The council is made up of 8 council members, who were elected by majority vote at the municipal election held on 7 June 2009, and the honorary mayor as chairwoman.

=== Mayor ===
Reckershausen's mayor is Christian Gehre.

=== Coat of arms ===
The German heraldic description states: Below a black chief, within which strides a golden lion with red claws and tongue, the shield is divided: in the front, red and silver checkered, and in the back, gold with a black diagonal grid overlaid with two crossed black mining hammers.

The municipality's arms might in English heraldic language be described thus: Per pale chequy of fifteen gules and argent and Or trellised sable surmounted by a hammer and a pick per saltire of the same, on a chief of the fourth a lion passant of the third armed and langued of the first.

The lion in the chief refers to the former landholders, the Counts Palatine of the Rhine and the Dukes of Simmern. Reckershausen lay within the area subject to the provost's office at Ravengiersburg Monastery. Until this foundation was dissolved in 1566, these noblemen were its Vögte, and until 1707 the lords over the provost's office. The “chequy” pattern on the dexter (armsbearer's right, viewer's left) side refers to the “Hinder” County of Sponheim, which had in Reckershausen many peasant subjects and 19 “farmyards”. The trellis on the sinister (armsbearer's left, viewer's right) side is meant to look like the mesh of a sieve, for sieve making and selling was in centuries gone by an important income earner for Reckershausen. The hammer and pick refer to mining within the municipality's limits.

The arms have been borne since 1990.

== Culture and sightseeing ==
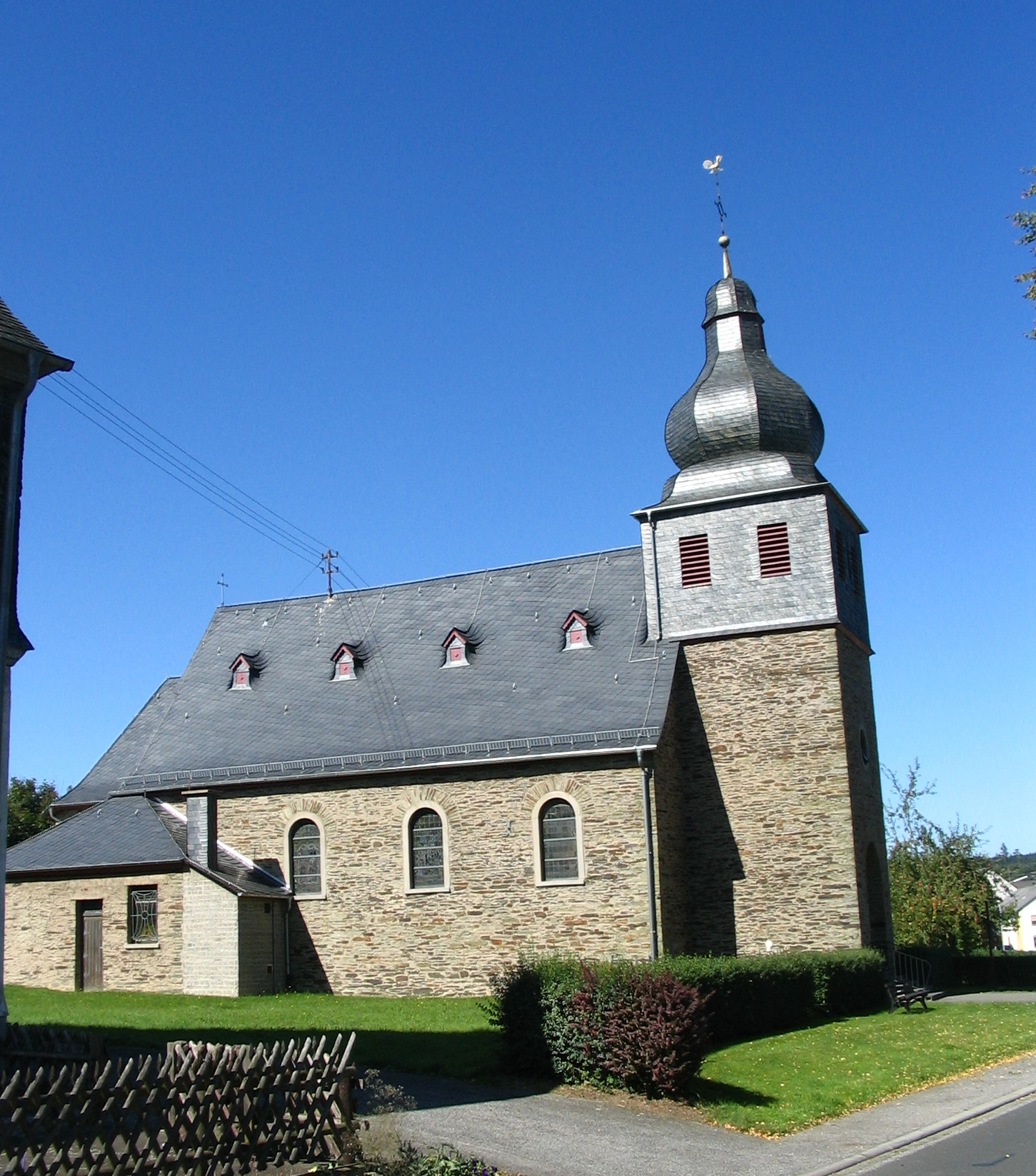
Kirchberger Straße 10: Saint Thecla's Catholic Church

=== Buildings ===
The following are listed buildings or sites in Rhineland-Palatinate’s Directory of Cultural Monuments:

- Saint Thecla's Catholic Church (Kirche St. Thekla), Kirchberger Straße 10 – Baroque Revival aisleless church, 1923-1935, architects Eduard Endler, Cologne, and Marx, Trier
- Kirchberger Straße, graveyard – sandstone graveyard cross, 19th century

=== Sport and leisure ===
Reckershausen also has a barefoot park and a natural swimming pool.
