= Unzenberg =

- Municipality
- Coat of arms

- Location of Unzenberg within Rhein-Hunsrück-Kreis district
- Interactive map of Unzenberg
- Location within Germany Location within Rhineland-Palatinate
- Coordinates: 49°58′11.30″N 7°26′22.77″E
- Country: Germany
- State: Rhineland-Palatinate
- District: Rhein-Hunsrück-Kreis
- Municipal assoc.: Kirchberg
- Subdivisions: 2

Government
  - Mayor (2019–24): Dietmar Klein

Area
  - Total: 5.50 km^{2} (2.12 sq mi)
- Elevation: 348 m (1,142 ft)

Population (2025-12-31)
  - Total: 436
  - Density: 79.3/km^{2} (205/sq mi)
- Time zone: UTC+01:00 (CET)
  - Summer (DST): UTC+02:00 (CEST)
- Postal codes: 55483
- Dialling codes: 06763
- Vehicle registration: SIM

Unzenberg is an Ortsgemeinde – a municipality belonging to a Verbandsgemeinde, a kind of collective municipality – in the Rhein-Hunsrück-Kreis (district) in Rhineland-Palatinate, Germany. It belongs to the Verbandsgemeinde of Kirchberg, whose seat is in the like-named town.

== Geography ==
=== Location ===
The municipality lies in the Hunsrück, in the Kauerbach valley, roughly 6 km west of Simmern and 3 km northeast of Kirchberg.

=== Constituent communities ===
Unzenberg's Ortsteile are Unzenberg, Göbenhausen and Tombach.

== History ==
North of the village in Field 2, called “Auf dem Bitzen”, a Roman estate is believed to have once lain. Over a wide area, there have been many archaeological finds, such as one coin, bricks, roof tiles, potsherds of all sizes and thinly adorned vases of red and grey clay. Some of these finds are kept at the municipal centre and some are in private ownership. The coin is said to have been lost.

Today's municipality of Unzenberg was formed out of three rural centres named Göbenhausen (7 farms), Tombach (3 farms) and Unzenberg (9 farms). In 1310, Unzenberg had its first documentary mention in a taxation register kept by Count Simon II of Sponheim.

The landholders and lords of the court were the Provosts of Ravengiersburg. Once the execution place had been set up on the Itzelbach Heights near Biebern, Unzenberg had to supply the blindfolds for the condemned prisoners.

Beginning in 1794, Unzenberg lay under French rule. In 1815 it was assigned to the Kingdom of Prussia at the Congress of Vienna. In the early 20th century, the railway station outside the village was built. Since 1946, it has been part of the then newly founded state of Rhineland-Palatinate.

== Politics ==
=== Municipal council ===
The council is made up of 8 council members, who were elected by majority vote at the municipal election held on 7 June 2009, and the honorary mayor as chairman.

=== Mayor ===
Unzenberg's mayor is Dietmar Klein.

=== Coat of arms ===
The German blazon reads: Schild von eingebogener, erniedrigter schwarzer Spitze, darin silberne Glocke, gespalten; rechts in Gold eine schwarze verschlungene Augenbinde, links in Grün über einer schräglinken silbernen Wellenleiste ein silbernes Mühlrad.

The municipality's arms might in English heraldic language be described thus: Tierced in mantle, dexter Or a blindfold bendwise sinister, the end in chief folded bendwise and the end thereof folded under sable, sinister vert a bend sinister wavy abased above which a waterwheel spoked of twelve all argent, and in base sable a bell of the fourth.

The tiercing symbolizes the three centres of Unzenberg, Göbenhausen and Tombach, which grew together to form today's municipality. The charge on the dexter (armsbearer's right, viewer's left) side, the blindfold, refers to the mediaeval blood court at Itzelbach, for which the village had to supply the blindfolds. The bell refers to the village bell. The two charges on the sinister (armsbearer's left, viewer's right) side, the waterwheel and the wavy bend sinister, represent the six former gristmills in the area and the local brook, the Kauerbach, respectively.

== Culture and sightseeing ==
=== Buildings ===
The following are listed buildings or sites in Rhineland-Palatinate’s Directory of Cultural Monuments:

- Brunnenstraße 6 – timber-frame Quereinhaus (a combination residential and commercial house divided for these two purposes down the middle, perpendicularly to the street), partly solid, 18th century, two barns; whole complex of buildings
- Kalkoferweg 4 – timber-frame house, latter half of the 19th century; whole complex of buildings with garden and barn
- At Raiffeisenstraße 1 – sandstone portal, marked 1749
- Ringstraße 2 – timber-frame house plastered, latter half of the 19th century; whole complex of buildings with barn
- Prussian milestone, south of the village on Bundesstraße 50, near the Kauerhof – basalt obelisk, first third of the 19th century

== Economy and infrastructure ==
=== Transport ===
South of the village runs the right-of-way of the Hunsrückquerbahn (railway) between Langenlonsheim and Hermeskeil, currently out of service and without tracks.
