= Rödelhausen =

- Municipality
- Coat of arms

- Location of Rödelhausen within Rhein-Hunsrück-Kreis district
- Interactive map of Rödelhausen
- Location within Germany Location within Rhineland-Palatinate
- Coordinates: 49°59′33″N 7°19′50″E
- Country: Germany
- State: Rhineland-Palatinate
- District: Rhein-Hunsrück-Kreis
- Municipal assoc.: Kirchberg

Government
  - Mayor (2019–24): Klaus Casper

Area
  - Total: 2.56 km^{2} (0.99 sq mi)
- Elevation: 430 m (1,410 ft)

Population (2025-12-31)
  - Total: 121
  - Density: 47.3/km^{2} (122/sq mi)
- Time zone: UTC+01:00 (CET)
  - Summer (DST): UTC+02:00 (CEST)
- Postal codes: 56858
- Dialling codes: 06543
- Vehicle registration: SIM

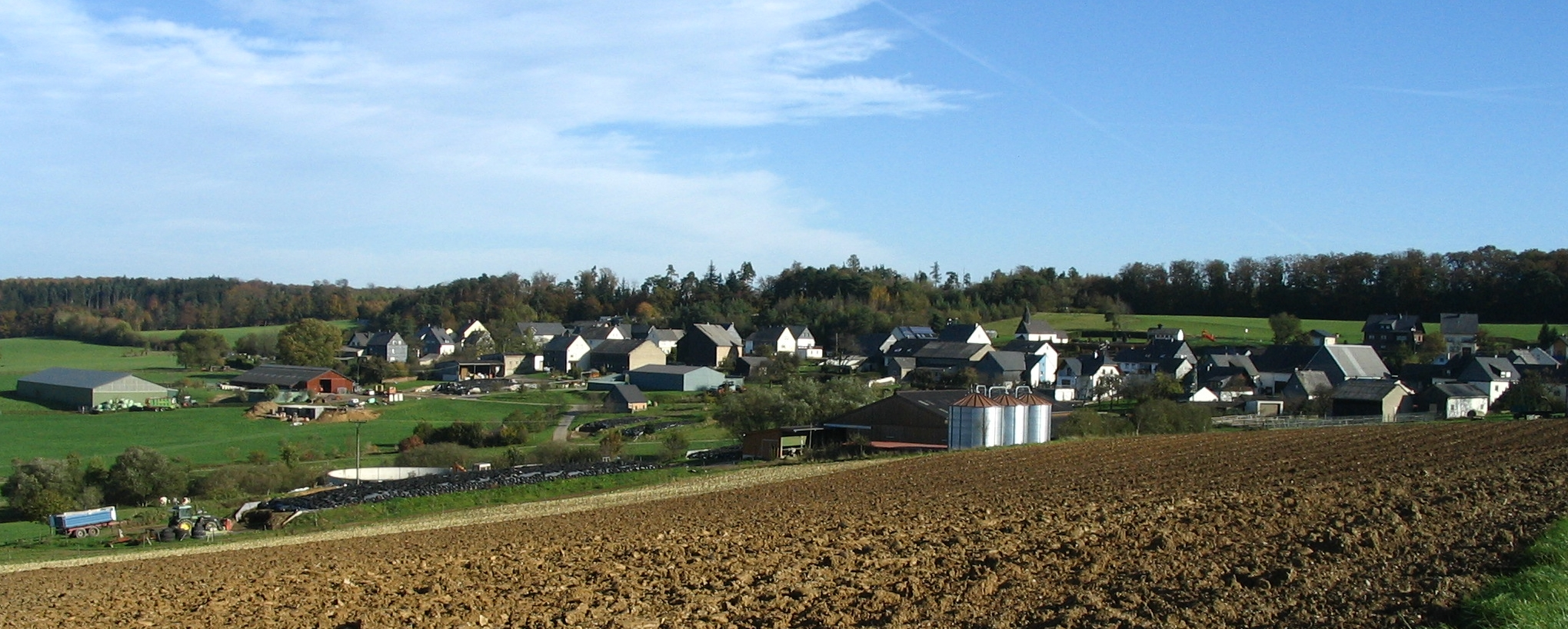
Rödelhausen seen from Belg

Rödelhausen is an Ortsgemeinde – a municipality belonging to a Verbandsgemeinde, a kind of collective municipality – in the Rhein-Hunsrück-Kreis (district) in Rhineland-Palatinate, Germany. It belongs to the Verbandsgemeinde of Kirchberg, whose seat is in the like-named town.

== Geography ==
=== Location ===
The municipality lies in the Hunsrück roughly 7 km northwest of Kirchberg and 6 km northeast of Frankfurt-Hahn Airport. Rödelhausen also lies right on the Hunsrückhöhenstraße (“Hunsrück Heights Road”, Bundesstraße 327, a scenic road across the Hunsrück built originally as a military road on Hermann Göring’s orders). The Rödelhausener Sandgrube (sandpit) is a geological rarity in the Hunsrück.

== History ==
Barrows from Late Hallstatt times with skeletal remains show that there were settlers quite early on. It is unknown when the village first arose, for this is not recorded in any document. From the 12th century, Rödelhausen was part of the County of Sponheim and in the 18th century passed to the Margraves of Baden. Beginning in 1794, Rödelhausen lay under French rule. In 1815 it was assigned to the Kingdom of Prussia at the Congress of Vienna. Since 1946, it has been part of the then newly founded state of Rhineland-Palatinate.

== Politics ==
=== Municipal council ===
The council is made up of 6 council members, who were elected by majority vote at the municipal election held on 7 June 2009, and the honorary mayor as chairman.

=== Mayor ===
Rödelhausen’s mayor is Klaus Casper.

=== Coat of arms ===
The German blazon reads: In Gold ein roter Schrägrechtsbalken, belegt mit drei silbernen Quadraten, vorn ein blaues, rotgegrifftes Hackmesser, hinten eine blaue Urne.

The municipality’s arms might in English heraldic language be described thus: Or a bend gules charged with three blocks argent between a flaying knife azure gripped of the second and an urn of the fourth.

The basic design, the red bend (slanted stripe) on the gold field, is the arms formerly borne by the Margraviate of Baden, Rödelhausen’s old overlord. It was in the Oberamt of Kirchberg. The blocks refer to Baden’s predecessors, the Counts of Sponheim, who bore “chequy” arms. Rödelhausen was in the “Further” County. The knife is Saint Bartholomew’s attribute, thus representing the church’s patron saint. The urn refers to an archaeological find at a barrow from Late Hallstatt times.

== Culture and sightseeing ==
=== Buildings ===
The following are listed buildings or sites in Rhineland-Palatinate’s Directory of Cultural Monuments:

- Catholic branch church, Lenzgraben 1 – Baroque aisleless church, marked 1747; cast-iron grave cross, Rheinböllen Ironworks, marked 1899; whole complex of buildings with graveyard
