= Hecken =

- Municipality
- Coat of arms

- Location of Hecken within Rhein-Hunsrück-Kreis district
- Interactive map of Hecken
- Location within Germany Location within Rhineland-Palatinate
- Coordinates: 49°54′55″N 7°23′53″E
- Country: Germany
- State: Rhineland-Palatinate
- District: Rhein-Hunsrück-Kreis
- Municipal assoc.: Kirchberg

Government
  - Mayor (2019–24): Heinz-Jürgen Ströher

Area
  - Total: 3.89 km^{2} (1.50 sq mi)
- Elevation: 420 m (1,380 ft)

Population (2025-12-31)
  - Total: 116
  - Density: 29.8/km^{2} (77.2/sq mi)
- Time zone: UTC+01:00 (CET)
  - Summer (DST): UTC+02:00 (CEST)
- Postal codes: 55481
- Dialling codes: 06763
- Vehicle registration: SIM
- Website: www.hecken-hunsrueck.de

Hecken (German pronunciation: [ˈhɛkn̩]) is an Ortsgemeinde – a municipality belonging to a Verbandsgemeinde, a kind of collective municipality – in the Rhein-Hunsrück-Kreis (district) in Rhineland-Palatinate, Germany. It belongs to the Verbandsgemeinde of Kirchberg, whose seat is in the like-named town.

== Geography ==
=== Location ===
The municipality lies in the Hunsrück some 3 km south of the town of Kirchberg, on the edge of the Kyrbach valley. The name Hecken derives from the Old High German word hag, meaning a hedged field or wood. Hecken's area is 3.89 km² and its elevation ranges from roughly 390 to 420 m above sea level. Roughly half the municipal area is wooded.

== History ==
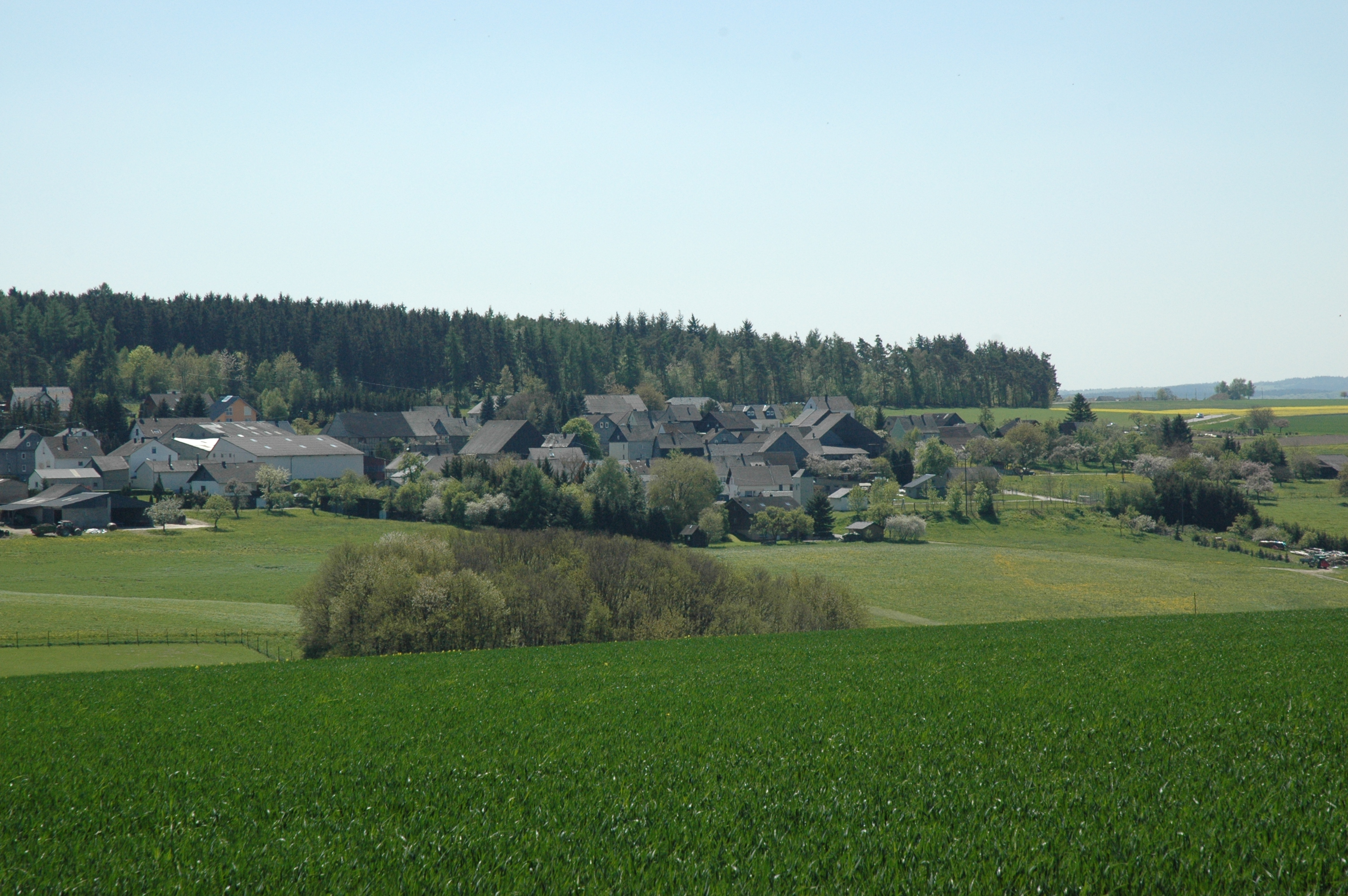
Hecken seen from the north

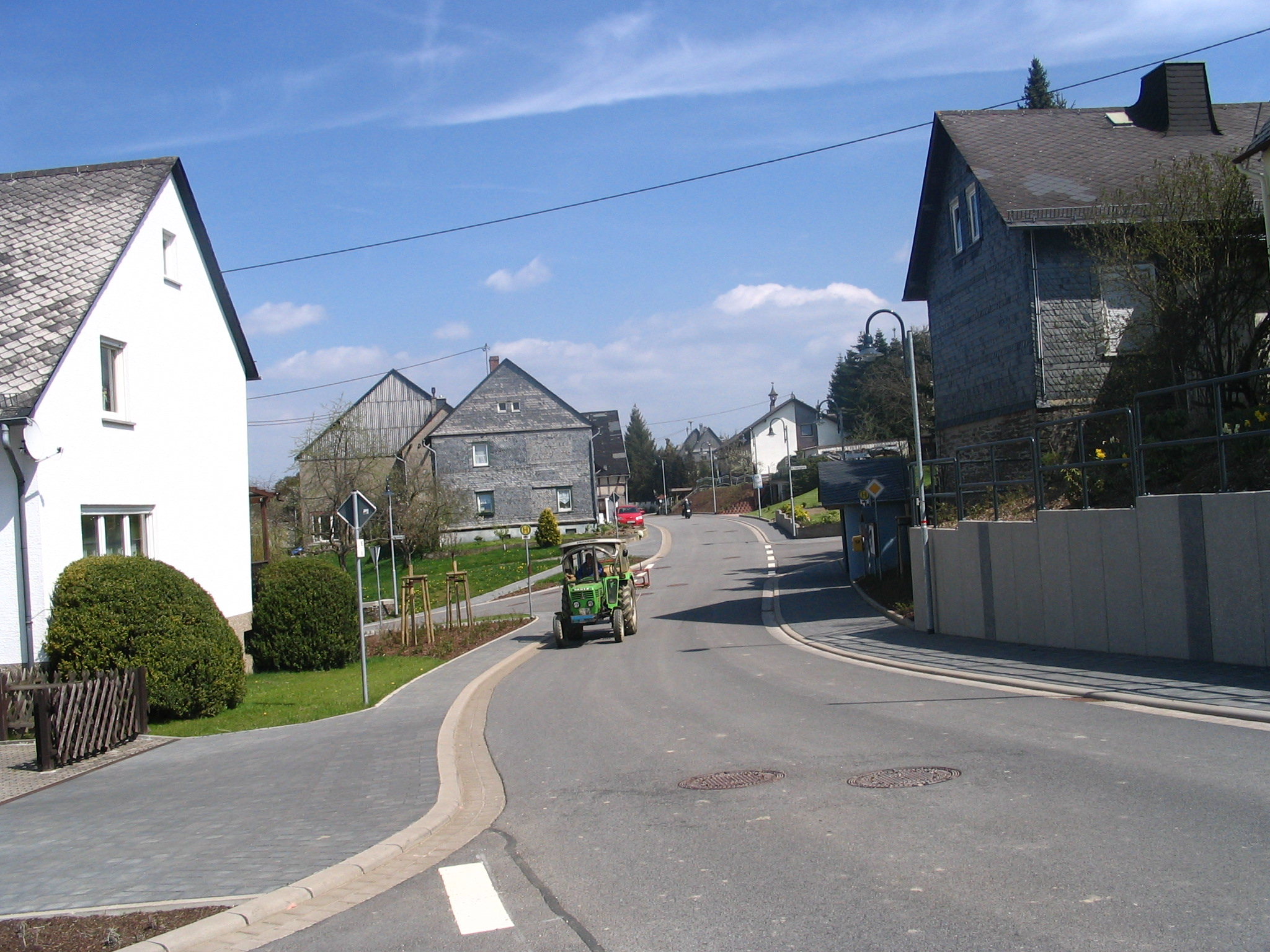
Hauptstraße seen from the west

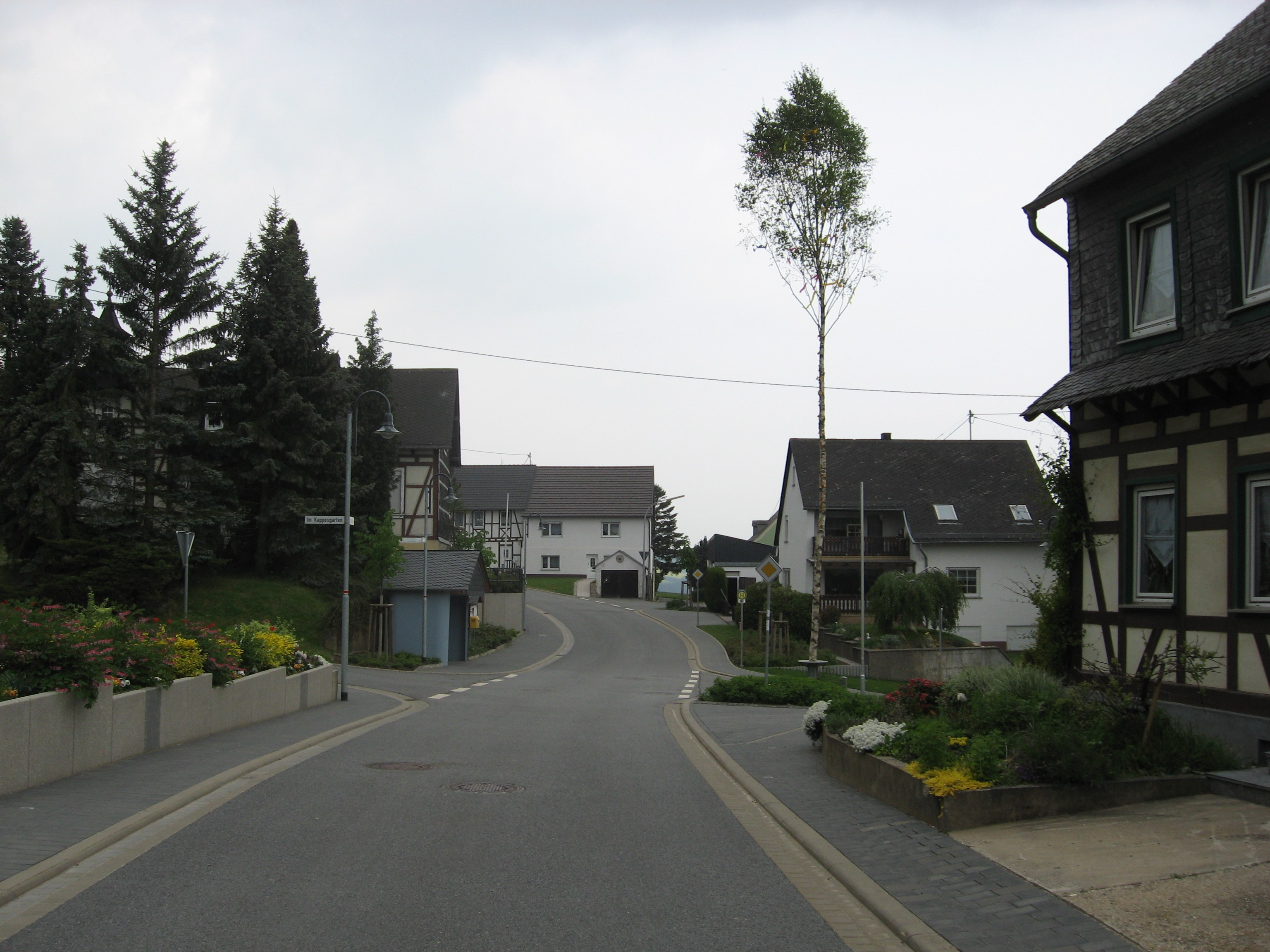
Hecken seen from the east

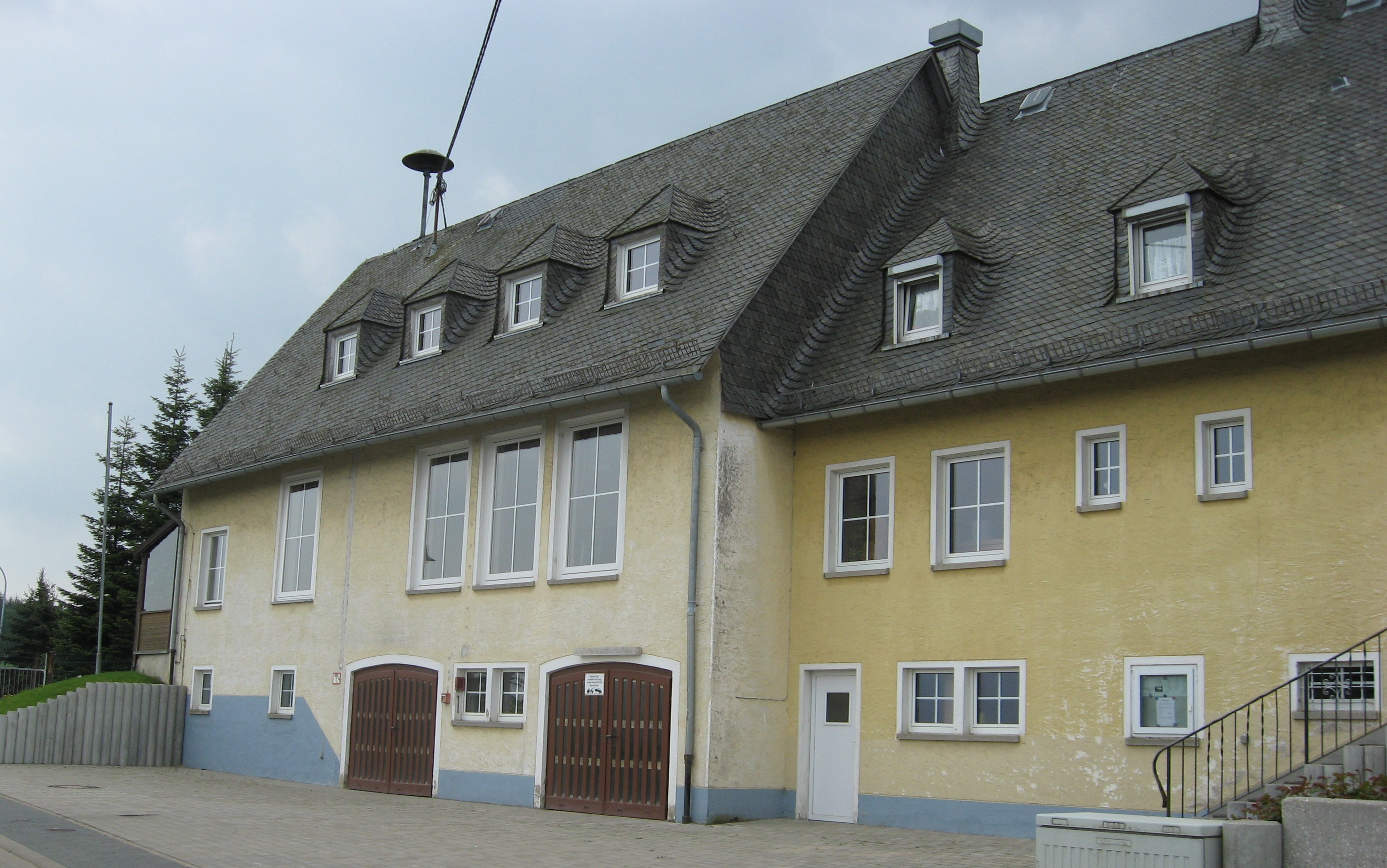
Municipal centre, former school

In 1291, Hecken had its first documentary mention when Count Johan von Sponheim gave his Burgmann from Kastellaun, Herrmann von Kestilun, leave to let his wife Sophia live at the estate in Hecken should anything untoward befall him.

A knightly family named itself after the village. The family's first representative, Heinrich von Hecken, belonged in 1290 to the Court of Schöffen (roughly “lay jurists”) at Kirchberg. In Hecken itself, the Counts had an estate made up of three houses and as many barns with the attendant estate lands.

The oldest written text that can be found in the municipality of Hecken comes from the year 1737 and is from the Princely Margravial Badish Court Councilman and Kirchberg Oberamtmann Seitz:

Erstens soll ein neu angehender Untertan oder Bürger bei seinem Antritt in die Gemeinde, bevor er das Gemeinsrecht erlangt hat, schuldig und gehalten sein, einen ledernen Feuereimer zu stellen, widrigenfalls und in solange derselbe in die Gemeinde nicht an– und aufgenommen werden soll, bis er dieses befolgt und solchen Feuereimer gestellt haben wird.

It is hardly something that sheds a great deal of light on historical developments in the 18th century, although it may offer a window on civic duties as they were defined in the Rhineland in those days. In English, this reads:

“First, a newly prospective subject or townsman, upon coming into the municipality, before he has been granted commoner’s rights, should be bound and obliged to provide a leather fire pail, failing which he should not be accepted and admitted, until he abides by this and has provided such a fire pail.”

Beginning in 1794, Hecken lay under French rule. In 1815 it was assigned to the Kingdom of Prussia at the Congress of Vienna. Since 1946, it has been part of the then newly founded state of Rhineland-Palatinate.

Among Hecken's distinctions are some 100 barrows scattered throughout the Bannholz (a wood whose function is to shield against adverse weather). It is the biggest barrow field in the middle Hunsrück. During planning work in the course of land consolidation in 1953, a neck ring, among other things, was found. This now stands as a charge in the municipality's coat of arms

== Religion ==
Since 1963, Hecken's Evangelical adherents have belonged the parish of Dickenschied in the church district of Simmern-Trarbach. The Catholics are members of Saint Michael's parish in Kirchberg.

== Politics ==
=== Municipal council ===
The council is made up of 7 council members, who were elected at the municipal election held on 7 June 2009, and the honorary mayor as chairman.

=== Mayor ===
Hecken's mayor is Heinz-Jürgen Ströher, and his deputies are Rüdiger Henn and Winfried Berg. (2016)

=== Coat of arms ===
The German blazon reads: In Gold auf grünem Dreiberg, darin ein silberner Wendelring, ein grüner Heckenrosenstrauch mit einer blau besamten roten Rose.

The municipality's arms might in English heraldic language be described thus: Or in base a mount of three vert charged with a neck ring argent, issuant from the mount a rose stem embowed to dexter of the second with a rose gules barbed of the second and seeded azure.

The rose is a canting charge, as it is meant to represent what in German is known as a Heckenrose (Rosa corymbifera, meaning “hedge rose” – similar to a dog rose), and thereby refers to the name Hecken. The “mount of three” in base, a charge called a Dreiberg in German heraldry, refers in these arms to the barrow field in the nearby woods from the Hunsrück-Eifel Culture and Roman times. The neck ring refers to the one unearthed, along with other artefacts, east of the village in 1953.

The arms have been borne since 1997.

== Culture and sightseeing ==
=== Buildings ===
The following are listed buildings or sites in Rhineland-Palatinate’s Directory of Cultural Monuments:

- Dorfstraße 32 – bakehouse; quarrystone building, marked 1873
- Im Kappesgarten 2 – former school; timber-frame building, marked 1878 (see also below)

From 1878 comes the timber-frame house known as the Haus Ursula. This former school was thoroughly renovated in 1978 and is now used as a meeting house by a religious institute. The former school bell hangs in a separate belltower and is rung by hand each evening, and also on special occasions such as deaths and church services.

=== Culture ===
Community life expresses itself in many kinds of activities, such as club festivals and celebrations, as well as collaborative work to reduce costs throughout the year.

== Economy and infrastructure ==
In Hecken, there are currently (2014) two full-time agricultural businesses. There is also one business in the building trade.
