= Woppenroth =

- Municipality
- Coat of arms

- Location of Woppenroth within Rhein-Hunsrück-Kreis district
- Interactive map of Woppenroth
- Location within Germany Location within Rhineland-Palatinate
- Coordinates: 49°52′32″N 7°24′54″E
- Country: Germany
- State: Rhineland-Palatinate
- District: Rhein-Hunsrück-Kreis
- Municipal assoc.: Kirchberg

Government
  - Mayor (2019–24): Detlef Schmitt

Area
  - Total: 8.67 km^{2} (3.35 sq mi)
- Elevation: 406 m (1,332 ft)

Population (2025-12-31)
  - Total: 224
  - Density: 25.8/km^{2} (66.9/sq mi)
- Time zone: UTC+01:00 (CET)
  - Summer (DST): UTC+02:00 (CEST)
- Postal codes: 55490
- Dialling codes: 06544
- Vehicle registration: SIM, BKS
- Website: www.woppenroth.de

Woppenroth is an Ortsgemeinde – a municipality belonging to a Verbandsgemeinde, a kind of collective municipality – in the Rhein-Hunsrück-Kreis (district) in Rhineland-Palatinate, Germany. It belongs to the Verbandsgemeinde of Kirchberg, whose seat is in the like-named town.

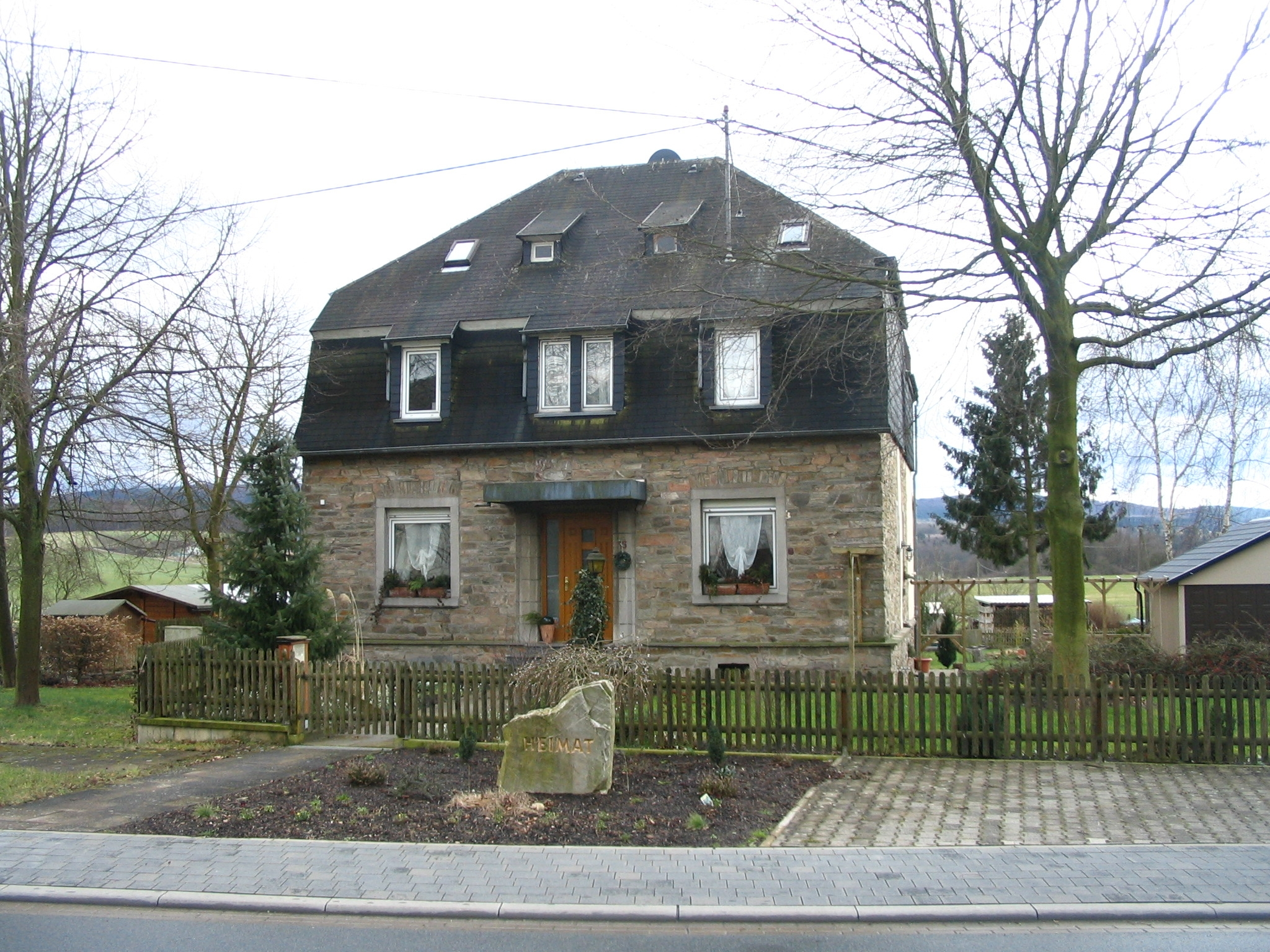
Monument stone to the film Heimat in the village centre

== Geography ==
=== Location ===
The municipality lies at an elevation of more than 400 m above sea level on a plateau in the central Hunsrück, roughly 7 km south of Kirchberg and 12 km southeast of Frankfurt-Hahn Airport. South of the village looms the Lützelsoon, a small wooded hill region. To the west lies the Hahnenbach valley, and to the east the Kellenbach valley. The plateau stretches northwards to Dickenschied and Kirchberg.

East–west through the village runs Landesstraße (State Road) 162 from Rhaunen to Gemünden, crossing Landesstraße 184 from Kirchberg to Kirn not far east of the village.

=== Geology ===
In the Hahnenbach valley and its side valleys, Devonian slate was mined until the early 20th century. All that now bears witness to this epoch in the village's history is some gallery entrances and tailing heaps.

== History ==
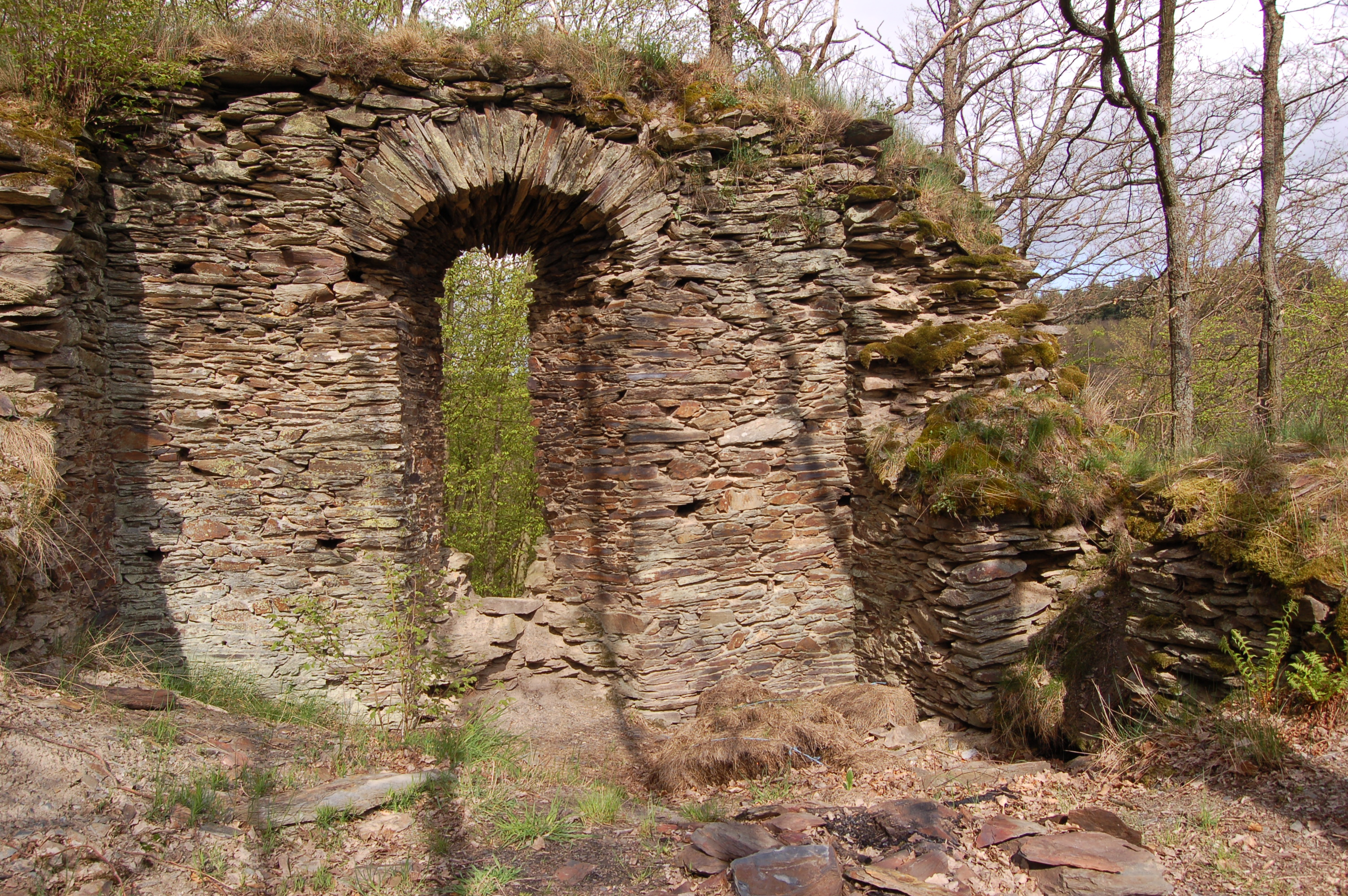
Hellkirch ruin

Within Woppenroth's municipal limits, tools from the New Stone Age have been discovered. Since 1945, bronze jewellery (bracelets and rings), along with clay pots, have been found in barrows dating from between 1600 and 1200 BC. “Woppenroth” is a “clearing name”, a reference to its placename ending —roth, which comes from the same root as the German verb roden, meaning “clear”. This ending and its variants —rode and —rath mainly mark places whose founding dates back to the time when the Franks took over the land. This is underscored by the village's location in the Hunsrück's dry, high plateaux, where the land is easier to work. The moister valleys were settled later.

In 1269, Woppenroth had its first documentary mention. In the document itself, Waldgrave Emich of Kyrburg (a castle near Kirn, now in ruins) transferred the village for 100 Trier pounds to Wilhelm of Schmidtburg (another now ruined castle, this one between Kirn and Rhaunen; for more on the area's history, see Simmern).

Beginning in 1794, Woppenroth lay under French rule. In 1815 it was assigned to the Kingdom of Prussia at the Congress of Vienna. In 1822, Prussia assigned it to the Rhine Province. Since 1946, it has been part of the then newly founded state of Rhineland-Palatinate.

The villages of Kaffeld and Blickersau near Woppenroth both vanished long ago. The former was destroyed in 1399 in the Nassau feud. The latter, which lay on the Hahnenbach, and whose municipal area is now shared by Woppenroth and Hausen, had already fallen into ruins by 1469, but arose once again, albeit for only a few years, in the 19th century. About the ruin known as the Hellkirch standing 60 m up above the Hahnenbach valley not much is known, not even whether, as its name implies, it actually was a church. This is nonetheless believed likely – it may have been a chapel – and its architecture – 1.5 m-thick walls, inside wall length 4.5 m, rectangular room inside – suggests a great age. Its name may come from the Middle High German helde, meaning a hill with steep slopes. Hell is known to have been a dialectal word used on into the 20th century for steep mountain slopes.

=== Church ===
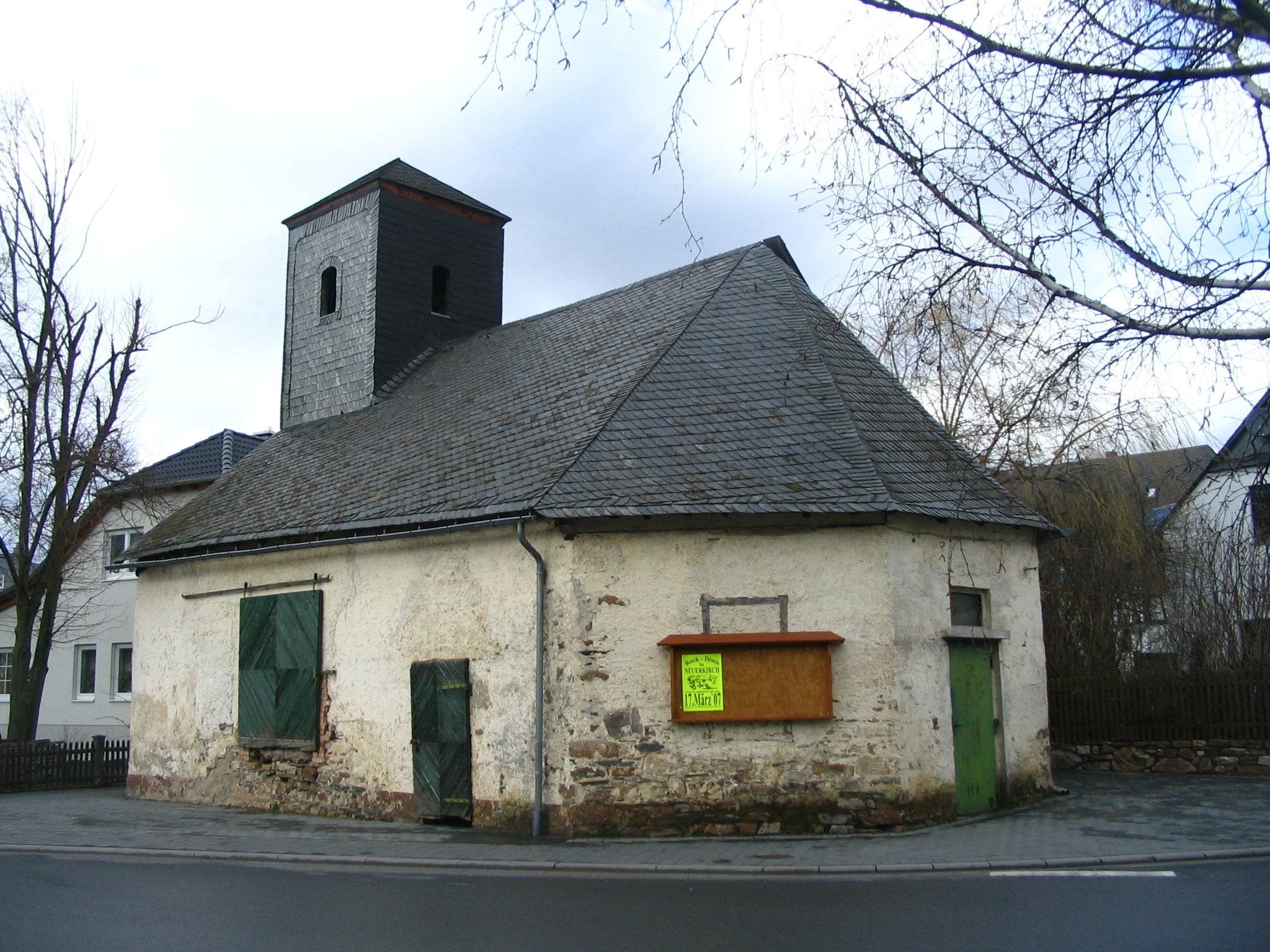
Old Raiffeisen storehouse (former village church)

In 1913, work was begun on the new church, which still stands today, to replace the old one, which had become too small, and which later served as a Raiffeisen storehouse. The new church was used beginning in 1920, although it was not consecrated until 1926. The two bronze bells, which had already seen service in the old church beginning in 1889, and one of which supposedly came from the Hellkirch, were seized for war requirements in the First World War and have been replaced with steel bells.

Two hundred and twenty-nine Woppenrothers are Evangelical. The Woppenroth Evangelical parish was transferred from the Trier church district to the Simmern-Trarbach church district in 1976, and has been parochially tied to Dickenschied, Rohrbach and Womrath ever since.

== Politics ==
=== Municipal council ===
The council is made up of 6 council members, who were elected by majority vote at the municipal election held on 7 June 2009, and the honorary mayor as chairman. In the term from 2004 to 2009, there were 8 council members.

=== Mayor ===
Woppenroth's mayor is Detlef Schmitt.

=== Coat of arms ===
The German blazon reads: In gespaltenem Schild vorne in Gold ein blaubewehrter und -gezungter roter Löwe. Hinten ein silberner Wellenbalken begleitet oben in Grün von einer silbernen Ruine mit einem Fenster, unten in Schwarz von einer silbernen Schnalle.

The municipality's arms might in English heraldic language be described thus: Per pale Or a lion rampant sinister gules armed and langued azure and a fess wavy argent between vert a ruin of the fourth with a window of the field and sable an arming buckle of the fourth.

The charge on the dexter (armsbearer's right, viewer's left) side, the lion, is a reference to the village's former allegiance to the Waldgravial and Rhinegravial Court of Hausen. The wavy fess on the sinister (armsbearer's left, viewer's right) side refers to the local brook's former status as a border. The charge above this is from the Hellkirch ruin, which stands within Woppenroth's limits. The silver buckle on the black field is the armorial device formerly borne by the Schmidtburgs, who once held rights in Woppenroth.

== Culture and sightseeing ==
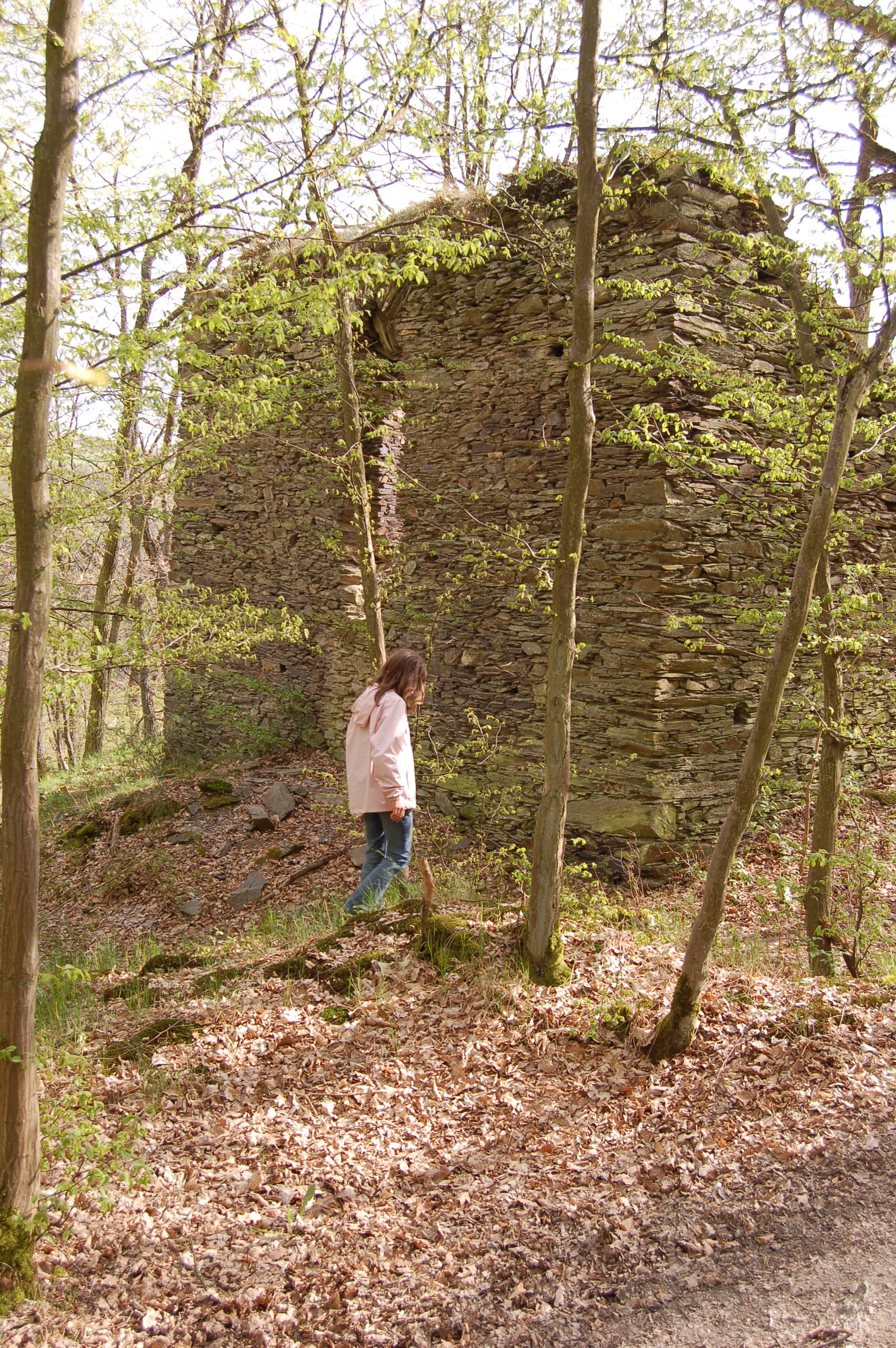
Hellkirch ruin seen from the east

=== Buildings ===
The following are listed buildings or sites in Rhineland-Palatinate’s Directory of Cultural Monuments:

- Bergstraße 2 – timber-frame house, partly solid or slated, hipped mansard roof, marked 1793; whole complex of buildings
- Hauptstraße 13 – Old Church (now a storage hall); aisleless church, 18th or 19th century
- Hellkirch ruin, southwest of the village – church ruin, 14th or 15th century

=== Heimat ===
Culturally, Woppenroth is best known for its link to the Heimat series: In 1981 and 1982, the first season of the film series Heimat – Eine deutsche Chronik (1984) was filmed in Woppenroth and other places in the Hunsrück. Woppenroth was the main centre in this production, and became an open-air “studio” with the fictitious name “Schabbach”. Many villagers served as extras during filming. In the third part of the series, Heimat 3 – Chronik einer Zeitenwende (2004), Woppenroth served once again as a backdrop. Other filming locations that stood in for “Schabbach” were Gehlweiler, Rohrbach and the Anzenfeldermühle (mill) in Schlierschied. The name “Schabbach” was drawn from a family name on a gravestone in Bischofsdhron, a constituent community of Morbach, found by Edgar Reitz, himself a native Hunsrücker.

=== Music ===
Woppenroth has four choirs, three of which are parts of the Evangelical church choir.

=== Sport and leisure ===
Running through Woppenroth is the Lützelsoon-Radweg (cycle path) between Kirn and Kirchberg. The Lützelsoon itself is also a place where one can cycle or hike.
