= Womrath =

- Municipality
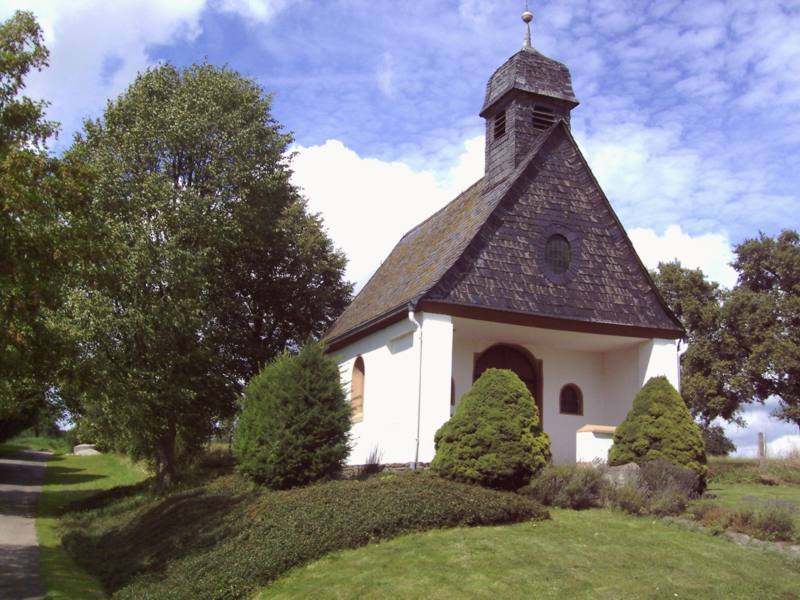
- Catholic chapel

- Coat of arms

- Location of Womrath within Rhein-Hunsrück-Kreis district
- Interactive map of Womrath
- Location within Germany Location within Rhineland-Palatinate
- Coordinates: 49°55′03″N 7°26′55″E
- Country: Germany
- State: Rhineland-Palatinate
- District: Rhein-Hunsrück-Kreis
- Municipal assoc.: Kirchberg

Government
  - Mayor (2019–24): Dirk Auler

Area
  - Total: 8.39 km^{2} (3.24 sq mi)
- Elevation: 375 m (1,230 ft)

Population (2025-12-31)
  - Total: 183
  - Density: 21.8/km^{2} (56.5/sq mi)
- Time zone: UTC+01:00 (CET)
  - Summer (DST): UTC+02:00 (CEST)
- Postal codes: 55481
- Dialling codes: 06763
- Vehicle registration: SIM
- Website: www.womrath.de

Womrath is an Ortsgemeinde – a municipality belonging to a Verbandsgemeinde, a kind of collective municipality – in the Rhein-Hunsrück-Kreis (district) in Rhineland-Palatinate, Germany. It belongs to the Verbandsgemeinde of Kirchberg, whose seat is in the like-named town.

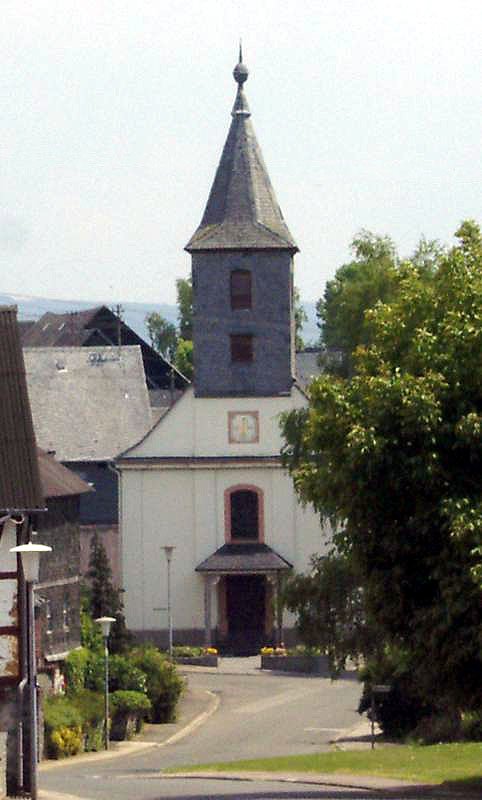
Womrath’s Evangelical church

== Geography ==
=== Location ===
The municipality lies on a ridge in the Hunsrück, roughly 4 km southeast of Kirchberg and 12 km east of Frankfurt-Hahn Airport. Also belonging to the village is an outlying hamlet called Wallenbrück, in the Simmerbach valley.

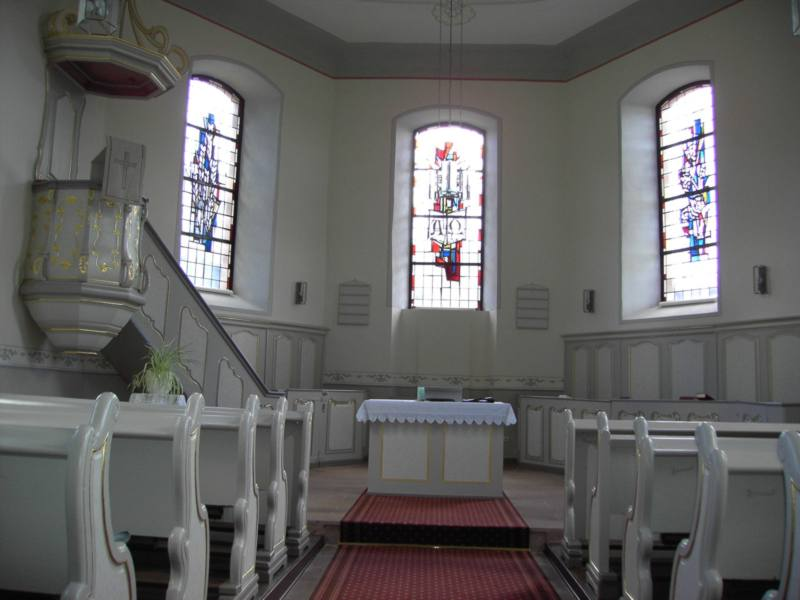
Inside the Evangelical church

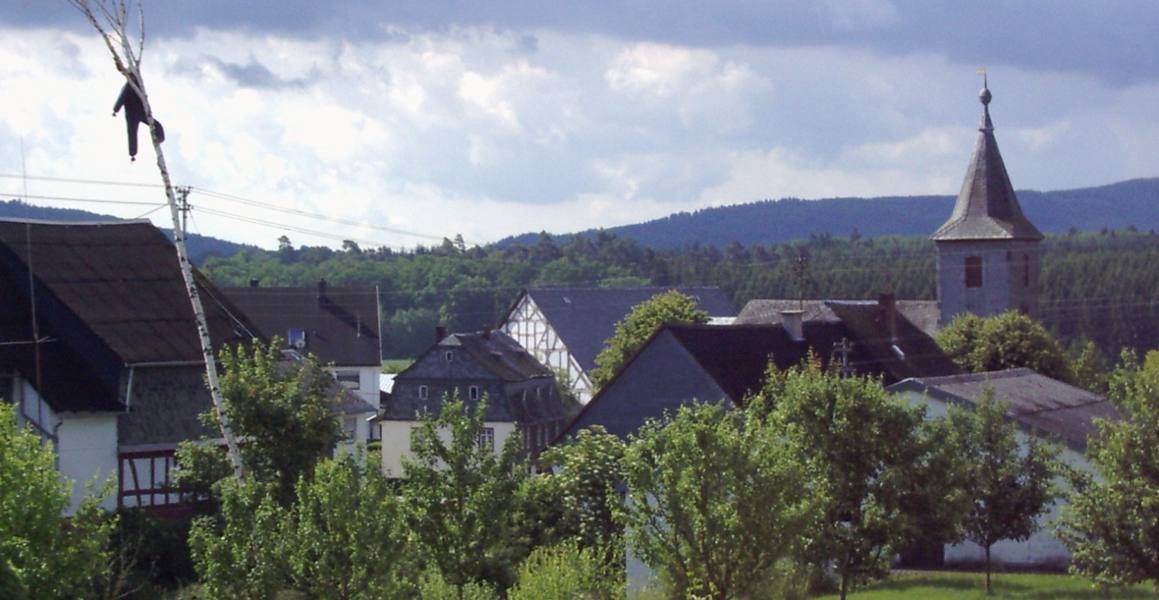
Womrath, seen from the north, with the Soonwald and the Lützelsoon

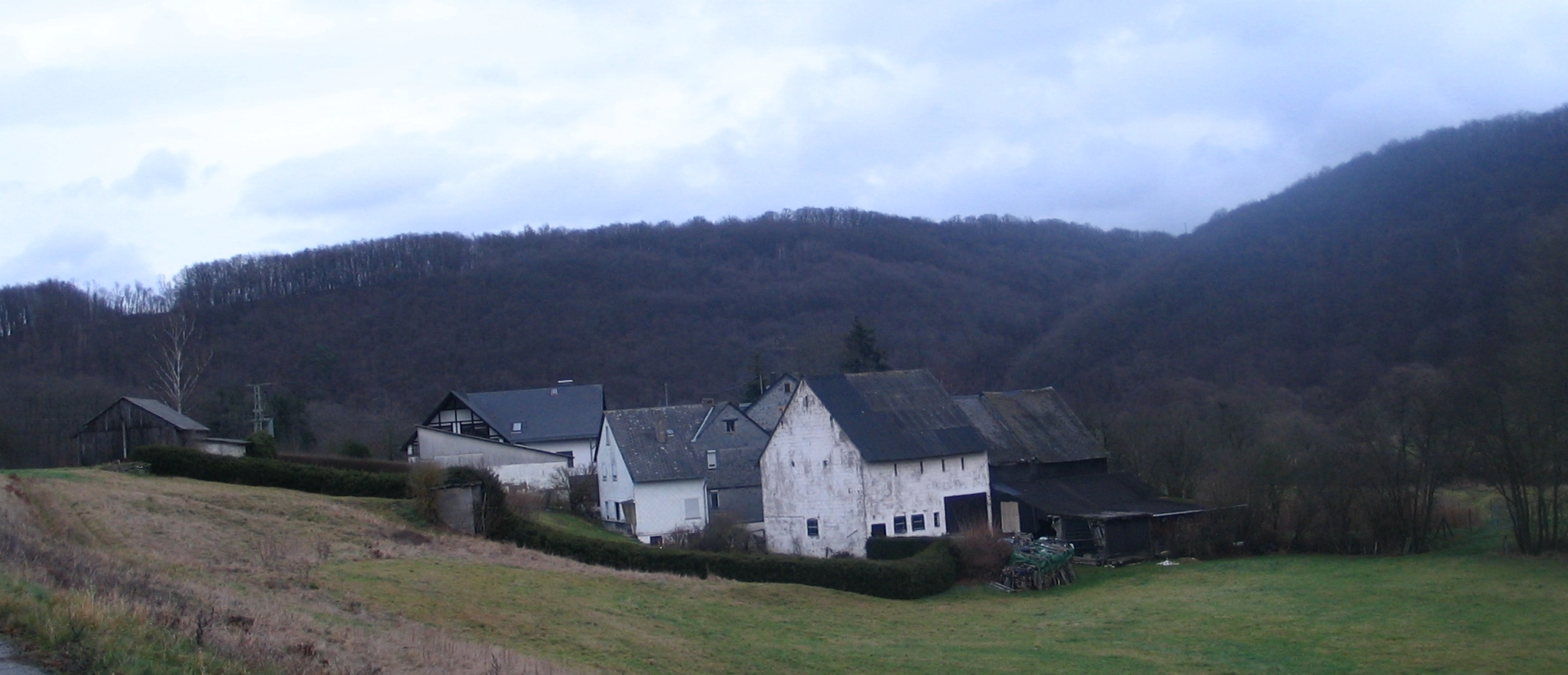
The hamlet of Wallenbrück in the Simmerbach valley

== History ==
Womrath has been settled since the Stone Age, as witnessed by archaeological finds made within municipal limits. From the times of the Celts, the Treveri (a people of mixed Celtic and Germanic stock, from whom the Latin name for the city of Trier, Augusta Treverorum, is also derived) and the Romans have come parts of a statue of Jupiter, jewellery, clay pots, clay and copper urns.

The Romans built a road through Womrath linking the Trier–Bingen long-distance road at Dumnissus (now Denzen, an Ortsteil of Kirchberg) with the Nahe valley and going farther on to Cruciniacum (now Bad Kreuznach). In 1924, evidence was found only 50 cm deep in the ground of a paved Roman road.

The area remained inhabited continuously. An estate in the Womrath area served the supply needs of the Counts of Sponheim. On 16 October 1299, Womrath had its first documentary mention in an agreement on legal conditions in the Dill area between the Lords of the “Further” and “Hinder” Counties of Sponheim, whose seats were in Bad Kreuznach and Enkirch respectively. Beginning in 1794, Womrath lay under French rule. In 1815 it was assigned to the Kingdom of Prussia at the Congress of Vienna. Since 1946, it has been part of the then newly founded state of Rhineland-Palatinate.

=== Werner of Womrath ===
In 1287 came news from Bacharach of the supposed murder of a boy, Werner of Womrath, now widely believed to have been a victim of a sexual crime. His body had been found washed up on the riverbank near Oberwesel. Rumours spread that he had been ritually murdered by Jews on Good Friday (some texts hold that it was Maundy Thursday). Werner had been employed by a Jewish family. This led to pogroms against Jews along the Middle Rhine valley and to processions of “Christian charity” to Oberwesel, where Werner had lived, and to Womrath, his home village.

Despite many tries, Werner was never canonized, but a “Feast of Saint Werner” was nonetheless regularly held until 1963, when the Catholic Diocese of Trier officially struck it off the liturgical calendar once Catholic church historians had shown the feast to be untenable given the contradictions within the Werner legends themselves. The blood libel in the case of Werner of Oberwesel, as he is now called, nowadays seems quite typical of the times. In Bacharach, the Rheinromantik ruin of “Saint Werner’s Chapel” still stands.

=== Schinderhannes ===
In the 17th and 18th centuries, the outlying hamlet of Wallenbrück was home to Johannes Bückler's (“Schinderhannes’s”) forebears. They worked as knackers in this otherwise unoccupied hamlet (today, ten people live there). The Simmerbach, which flows by Wallenbrück, then formed the border between the Margraviate of Baden and the County of Sponheim, thereby making it a point of interest to anyone on the edges of society.

== Religion ==
Today's Evangelical church, which has a congregation of 161 Womrathers, was built in 1773, and from 1774 to 1912 was used as a simultaneous church. The Evangelical parish of Womrath, which belongs to the church district of Simmern-Trarbach, has been parochially tied to the Evangelical parish of Dickenschied since the Reformation, and obliged to adhere to Reformed beliefs. Between 1934 and 1937, in the time of the Third Reich, Paul Schneider, who was later murdered by the SS at Buchenwald, worked in Womrath as an Evangelical clergyman. The Catholics, who belong to the parish of Dickenschied and who make up roughly one sixth of the population, have had their own chapel west of the village, Saint Werner's Chapel (Werner-Kapelle), since 1911.

== Politics ==
=== Municipal council ===
The council is made up of 6 council members, who were elected by majority vote at the municipal election held on 7 June 2009, and the honorary mayor as chairman.

=== Mayor ===
Womrath's mayor is Dirk Auler.

=== Coat of arms ===
The German blazon reads: In Blau 3 (2:1) goldene Dornenkreuze.

The municipality's arms might in English heraldic language be described thus: Azure three crosses engrailed Or.

According to communication from the Koblenz State Archive to the town and Amt administration of Kirchberg (Hunsrück) dated 2 September 1965, a blazon for a coat of arms for “Johann von Womrath, Johannes von Womerod- Wepeling” had been established that had no mention of tinctures, as it had likely been composed going by a seal used by Johann von Womrath. In these old records it says: Im Schild 3 (2:1) Zackenkreuze, although Zackenkreuze has more the meaning of “crosses indented” (that is, with a zigzag edge) than what would be the correct term, namely Dornenkreuze (literally “thorn crosses”; rendered “crosses engrailed” in English heraldic language, that is, with “serrated” edges).

The former lordship over Womrath was led by the Counts of Sponheim of the “Further” County in Kreuznach, whose heraldic tinctures were Or and azure (gold and blue). These have been incorporated into the blazon, yielding Womrath's modern coat of arms.

The remark “(2:1)” is not in the English translation of the blazon because this distribution of a triple charge is considered the “default” in English heraldry.

== Culture and sightseeing ==
=== Buildings ===
The following are listed buildings or sites in Rhineland-Palatinate’s Directory of Cultural Monuments:

- Evangelical church, Kirchplatz 2 – Early Classicist aisleless church, 1774
- Eckstraße 2 – timber-frame house, partly solid or slated, hipped mansard roof, 19th century
- Im Bangert 12 – estate complex; timber-frame house, partly solid or slated, marked 1857, timber-frame barn marked 1855
- Saint Werner's Catholic Chapel (Wernerkapelle), west of the village – aisleless church, 1910/1911, architect Eduard Endler, Cologne
- Langenauer Mühle, on Kreisstraße 6 east of the village – timber-frame bungalow, marked 1758, house possibly newer
- Water cistern, on Kreisstraße 6 west of the village – plastered building with triangular gable, marked 1906

== Economy and infrastructure ==
The formerly dominant industry, agriculture, has all but vanished. All that is left is two full-time agricultural businesses and one boarding stable.
