= Kappel, Rhineland-Palatinate =

Kappel
- Municipality
- Coat of arms

- Location of Kappel within Rhein-Hunsrück-Kreis district
- Interactive map of Kappel
- Location within Germany Location within Rhineland-Palatinate
- Coordinates: 50°00′02″N 7°21′36″E
- Country: Germany
- State: Rhineland-Palatinate
- District: Rhein-Hunsrück-Kreis
- Municipal assoc.: Kirchberg

Government
  - Mayor (2019–24): Markus Marx

Area
  - Total: 12.41 km^{2} (4.79 sq mi)
- Elevation: 475–490 m (1,558–1,608 ft)

Population (2025-12-31)
  - Total: 453
  - Density: 36.5/km^{2} (94.5/sq mi)
- Time zone: UTC+01:00 (CET)
  - Summer (DST): UTC+02:00 (CEST)
- Postal codes: 55483
- Dialling codes: 06763
- Vehicle registration: SIM
- Website: www.kappel-hunsrueck.de

Kappel (German pronunciation: [ˈkapl̩]) is an Ortsgemeinde – a municipality belonging to a Verbandsgemeinde, a kind of collective municipality – in the Rhein-Hunsrück-Kreis (district) in Rhineland-Palatinate, Germany. It belongs to the Verbandsgemeinde of Kirchberg, whose seat is in the like-named town.

== Geography ==
=== Location ===
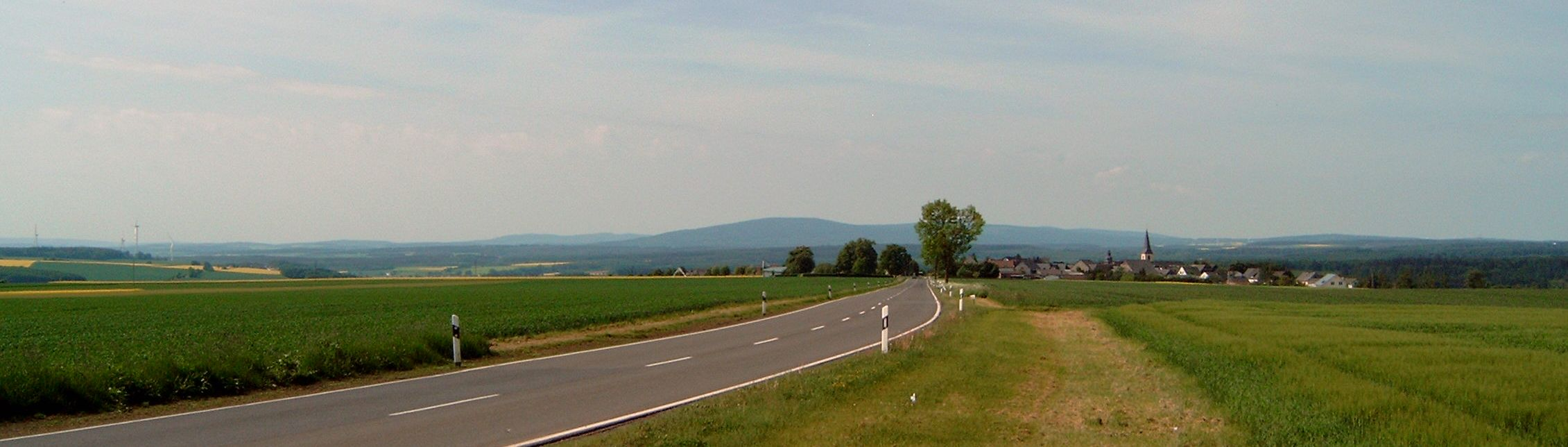
Plateau with the Idarkopf

The municipality lies in the Hunsrück on the western boundary of the Verbandsgemeinde of Kirchberg, which here also forms the district boundary between the Rhein-Hunsrück-Kreis and the district of Cochem-Zell. The area within the municipality's limits is some 1 240 ha, of which 340 ha is wooded.

Kappel lies at the crossroads of Bundesstraßen 421 and 327, the latter of which is also known as the Hunsrückhöhenstraße (“Hunsrück Heights Road”, a scenic road across the Hunsrück built originally as a military road on Hermann Göring’s orders).

Kappel lies at the edge of a plateau which is capped off in the northeast by a knoll of some 525 m above sea level known as the Hasensteil. Between the flat hollow of the Kyrbach (brook) and a small gulley in Mörßberg (a long vanished village) towards Kludenbach, this plateau forms a ridge that presents itself especially prominently as a spur at the church hill. Beyond the brook, the plateau stretches on farther towards Frankfurt-Hahn Airport. On the horizon, it is marked by the Idarkopf (mountain). Also, it was in the neighbourhood of Zeller Straße (street) that water from the local aquifers was first drawn. This laid the groundwork for the settlement that has sprung up here.

== History ==
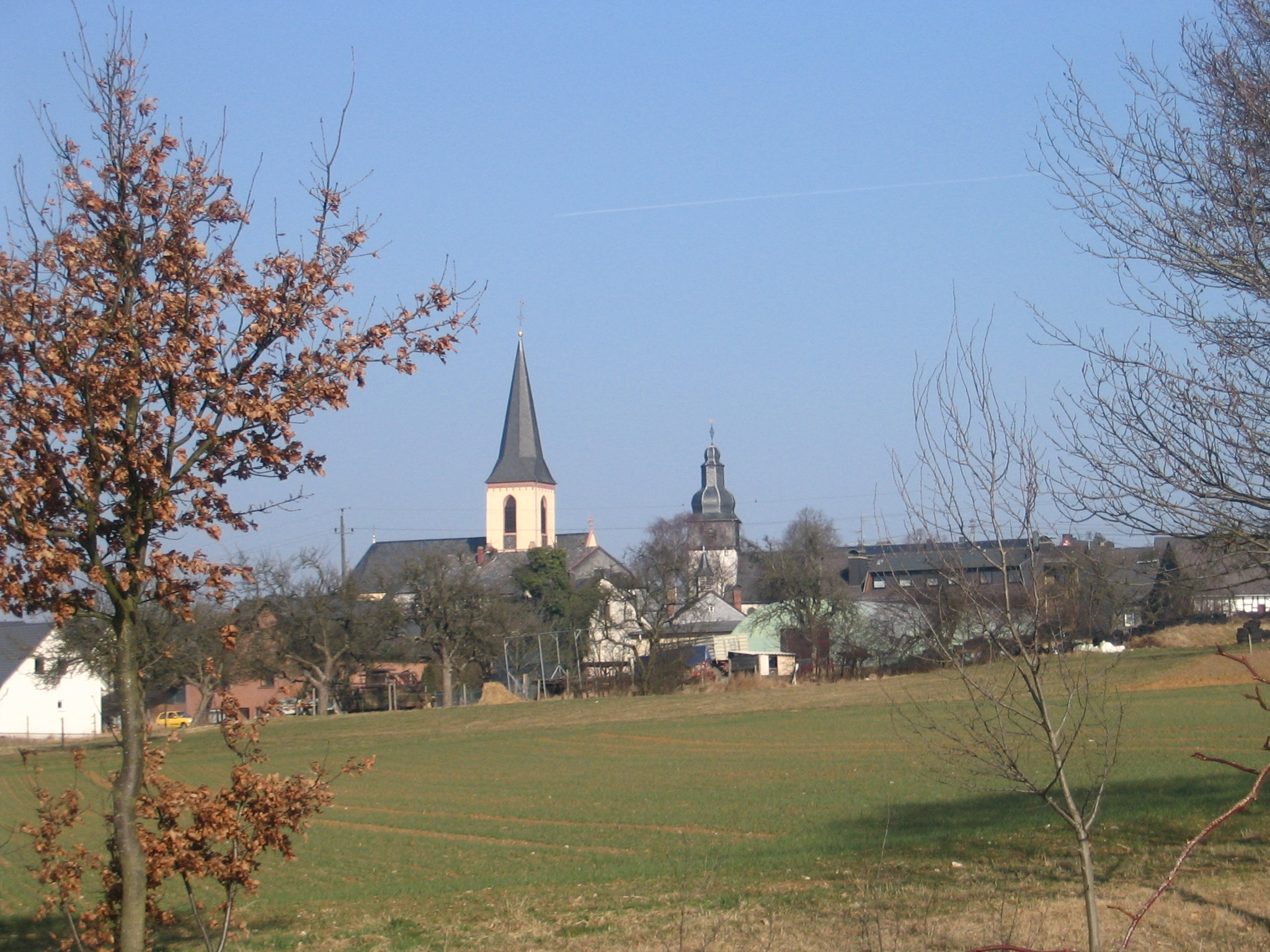
Kappel seen from the south

In 1091, Kappel had its first documentary mention in a document from Henry IV, Holy Roman Emperor in which he donated holdings in the Hunsrück to the High Foundation in Speyer. The placename, the location and Roman archaeological finds in and around Kappel, however, make it clear that the village must be much older, even if there is no proof of continuous habitation through all that time. In the Middle Ages, the village belonged to the “Further” County of Sponheim. Beginning in 1794, Kappel lay under French rule. In 1814 it was assigned to the Kingdom of Prussia at the Congress of Vienna. Since 1946, it has been part of the then newly founded state of Rhineland-Palatinate.

Right near the staggered intersection of Kastellauner Straße and Kirchberger Straße – a spot known as the Dreispitz (“three-point” or “tricorne”) – lies the village centre with the old Evangelical church from 1747 (as it says on the iron brackets on the tower) with mediaeval wall components, the bakehouse (called the Backes, a variant of the usual German word Backhaus) with its upper floor that housed the Catholic school's school room and teacher's dwelling until 1849, and two of the village's biggest homesteads with a guest parlour and guestrooms to let.

On into the 1950s, the innkeeper was one of the few who still owned horses. Baptist, the farmhand (possibly the only one in the village in those days) at the homestead zur Krone, now given up as an agricultural concern but now restored as the municipality's Heimathaus (local museum), rode and worked with a horse and a draught ox, while most small farmers did the same with their dairy cows.

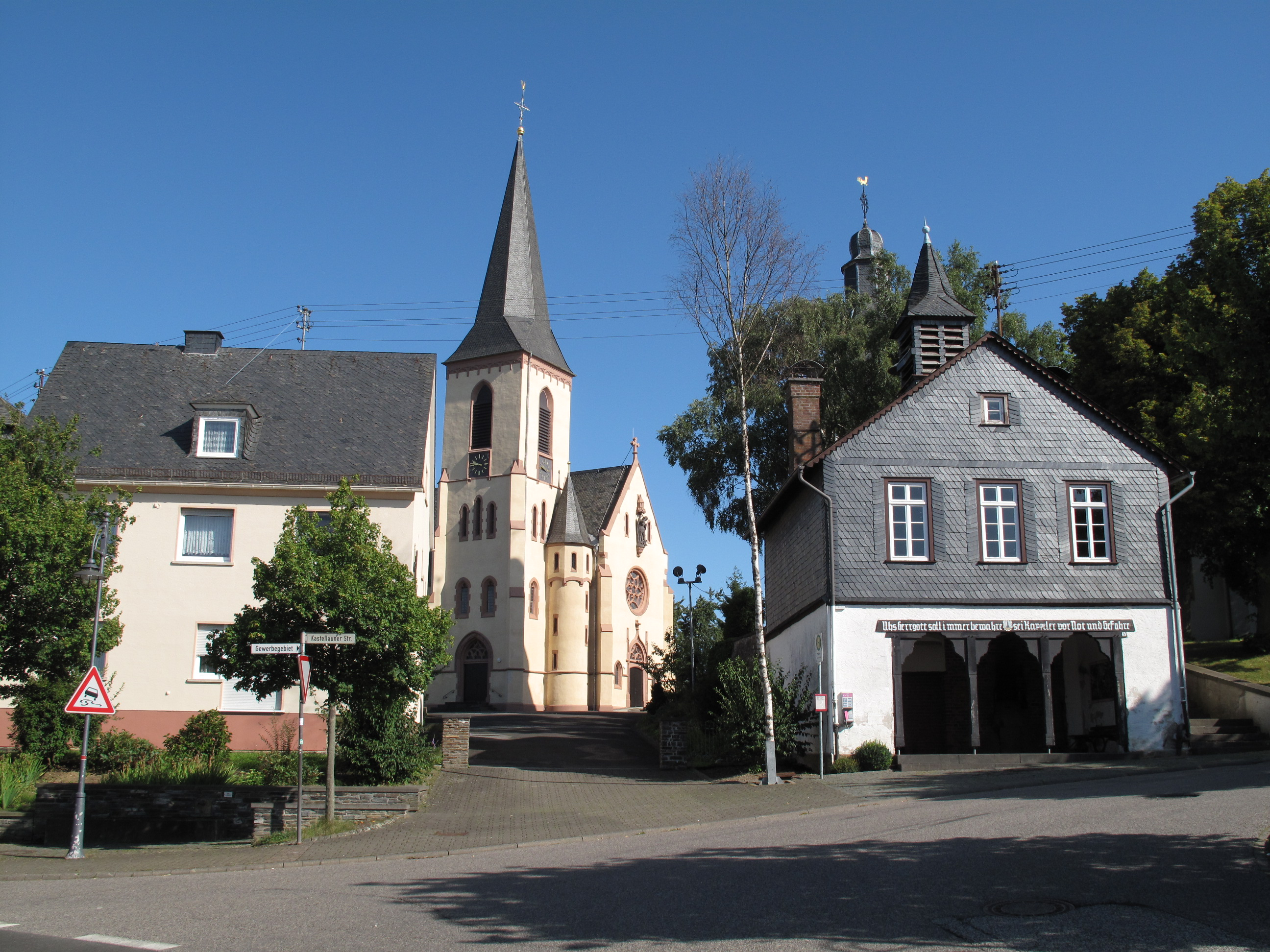
Old bakehouse and Catholic church

An Evangelical one-room school was built in 1913, after the Gothic Revival Catholic church had been built nearby in 1898 and 1899. The last Catholic school in the village dated only from the time after the First World War, indeed from 1928, well into Weimar times. Today there are no longer any schools in Kappel. The last one, which was run as an interdenominational primary school, was dissolved on 1 August 1971. The church, which today is Evangelical, served from 1688 to 1898 both Evangelicals and Catholics under a simultaneum. Before this time, it had long been the preserve of the Evangelicals. When the simultaneum was instituted by higher authorities, the minister moved to Würrich, which was wholly Evangelical, and ministered to his congregation from there.

The relations between denominations were and still are good. When the Catholic Church was being built, many Evangelicals donated money for the bells, for which favour they were also “rung out” by the Catholic Church when they died. The Evangelical congregation, nowadays numbering 232, was autonomous and parochially tied to Leideneck beginning in 1852, which had its own church, but no rectory. The Evangelical minister, who had taken up residence in Kappel once again in 1854, was responsible not only for his local parish, but also for Evangelicals in the “diaspora” – the overwhelmingly Catholic centres stretching down to the Moselle. Since 1976, Kappel has had no Evangelical minister and is now parochially tied to Kirchberg. The post of Catholic priest has been vacant since 1981, and the parish was in at first Biebern’s hands, and is now in Kirchberg’s.

Until the 1960s, Kappel was still wholly characterized by agriculture. Out of the 111 households here in 1949, 80 were farming households, of which only 8 held lands greater in area than 10 ha. Kappel had then 281 Protestant and 194 Catholic inhabitants. There were also then still a Kolonialwarengeschäft (a shop that sold “colonial” – that is, from outside Europe – goods such as sugar and coffee) in the village centre, and another small grocer's shop on what is now called Kirchberger Straße. The stationer's shop was next to the Catholic school. As well, there were a postal coach station in the Lower Village on what is now called Zeller Straße and a third inn on Waldgasse (“Forest Lane”).

Given the appreciable earnings from forest holdings, a new municipal centre, considered quite modern at the time, could be built in the 1950s. It had a fire station, a sugar beet syrup kitchen, a storage facility for large pieces of equipment used to steam, freeze and wash potatoes and even extra dwelling space upstairs for ethnic German refugees driven out of Germany's former eastern territories after the Second World War.

Work on a newer municipal centre began in 1965 because the citizens of Kappel and the local clubs wanted a venue big enough for family celebrations and events. A kindergarten was also planned for this new building, but this never came about. The demand for a slaughterhouse was likewise taken into account and a fully equipped slaughterhouse was integrated into the complex. The building was widely renovated and converted in 1997 and 1998. A kindergarten for two groups had been completed in the summer of 1993 (an earlier one had been built onto the Evangelical rectory in the 1950s).

=== Vanished villages ===
Within Kappel's municipal limits, or at them, is a whole series of former village sites that were forsaken even by the Middle Ages, although their names live on, now applied to the rural cadastral areas that are left where the villages once stood: Kyr, Kyrweiler (in older sources also called Kerweiler), Mörßberg, Rittelhausen, Langerode, Selze and Beinhausen. Kyrweiler, together with Rohrbach, Werschweiler near Dickenschied and Dickenschied itself, had to contribute to the maintenance of the newly instituted Dickenschied Pfarrvikarie (a parishlike body with its own priest) beginning in 1317.

== Politics ==
=== Municipal council ===
The council is made up of 12 council members, who were elected by majority vote at the municipal election held on 7 June 2009, and the honorary mayor as chairman.

=== Mayor ===
Kappel's mayor is Markus Marx.

=== Coat of arms ===
The German blazon reads: Über Blau-Gold geschachteltem Schildfuß in Silber eine schwarze Kapelle.

The municipality's arms might in English heraldic language be described thus: A base countercompony azure and Or above which argent a chapel sable.

The base “countercompony” (that is, with two chequered rows) is inspired by the “chequy” arms borne by the Counts of Sponheim and refers to the village's former allegiance to the “Further” County of Sponheim. The main charge in these arms, the chapel, is canting for the municipality's name: “chapel” is Kapelle in German, pronounced somewhat differently from the name Kappel, but still similar.

== Culture and sightseeing ==
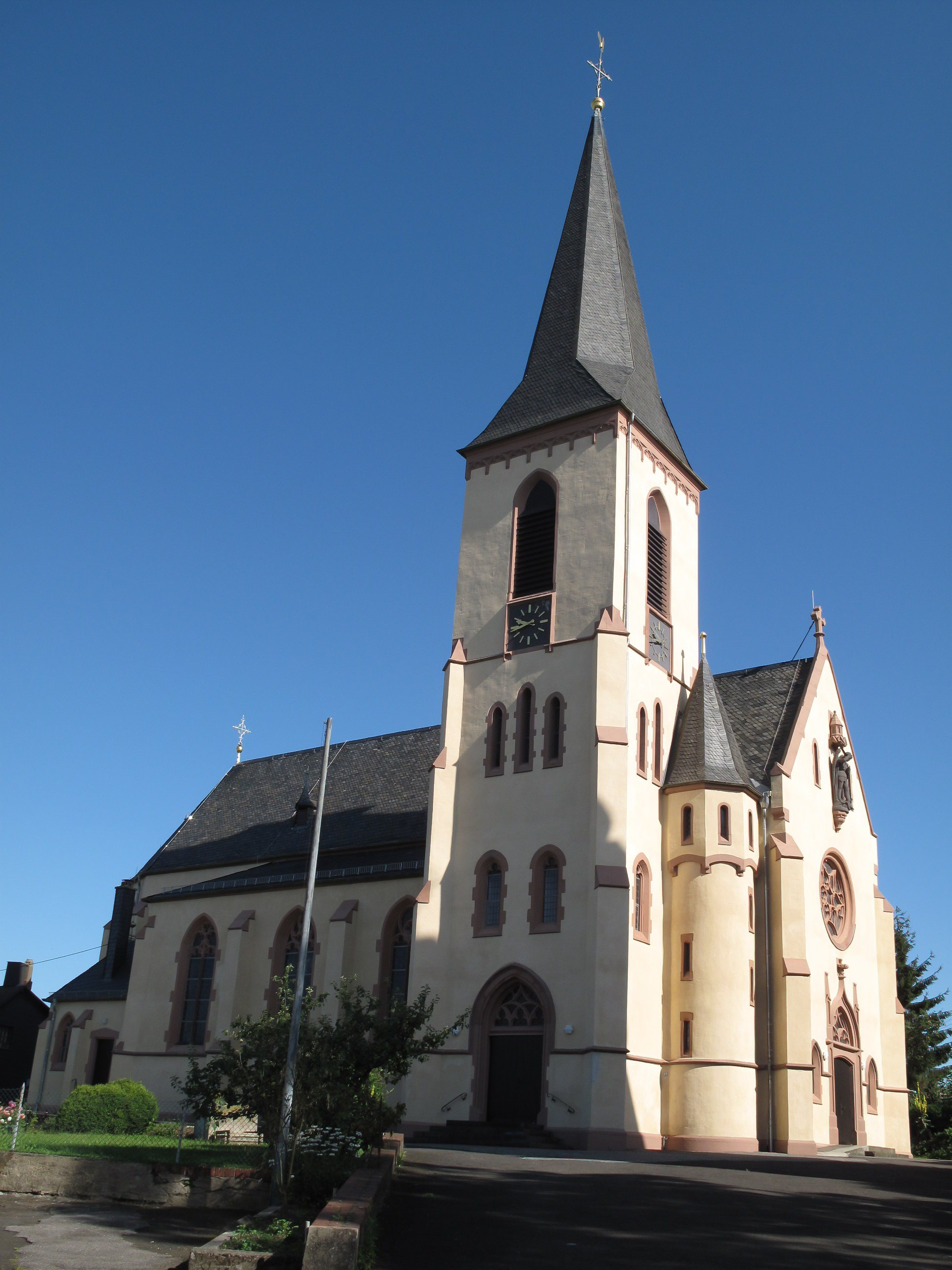
Catholic church

=== Buildings ===
The following are listed buildings or sites in Rhineland-Palatinate’s Directory of Cultural Monuments:

- Evangelical parish church, Kastellauner Straße 7 – Baroque aisleless church, marked 1747 (see also below)
- Catholic Parish Church of the Holy Trinity (Pfarrkirche Hl. Dreifaltigkeit), Kastellauner Straße 3 – Gothic Revival hall church, 1898/1899, architect Eduard Endler, Cologne (see also below)
- Kastellauner Straße 4 – local history museum; stately building with hipped mansard roof, timber-frame, partly slated, early 19th century
- Kastellauner Straße 5 – bakehouse; plastered building, partly slated, ground-floor hall, marked 1882; the back with half-hipped roof, timber-frame, 1910/1920
- Kastellauner Straße 17 – former Evangelical rectory; plastered building, marked 1907 (see also below)
- Kirchberger Straße 7 – building with hipped mansard roof, timber framing slated, early 19th century; votive cross, marked 1824
- Zeller Straße 7 – timber-frame house, 18th or 19th century, stable marked 1881; whole complex of buildings
- Zeller Straße 11 – building with hipped mansard roof, timber framing slated, 18th century; whole complex of buildings
- Graveyard, east-northeast of Kappel, east of Bundesstraße 327 – basalt Gothic Revival cross

=== Further information on local buildings and sites ===
The Evangelical church’s interior decoration is plain in the Reformed tradition, and its original organ from 1900 has been preserved. This came from the Oberlinger Brothers’ workshop. The three bronze bells were poured in 1779 at the Mabilo bellfoundry in Ehrenbreitstein (now an outlying centre of Koblenz). Owing to their historical importance, they managed to escape seizure by the authorities for war requirements in both world wars.

The Catholic Church was one of the earliest built by architect Eduard Endler. It has mediaeval burial reliefs from the former simultaneous church.

The 1907 Evangelical rectory is built in a not very ornate style somewhere between Gründerzeit and Art Nouveau. It has brick framing around the windows, sandstone components and a representative entrance. It has stood under monumental protection since 1988.

The mill stood far downstream from the village, but was nonetheless known as the Kappeler Mühle. It was on the old Waldgasse (“Forest Lane”) where it crossed the Hunsrückhöhenstraße and used the Kyrbach as its driving force. It is nowadays under private ownership.

=== Local dialect ===
The following rhyme serves as an example of the local speech. The local form is at left, followed by Standard High German in the middle with an English translation rightmost:

„Kimmste noh Kappel,
do wohnt de Pere Prappel,
dä hot’n Gaul,
dä scheißt der en Appel
uf et Maul.“

„Kommst du nach Kappel,
da wohnt der Peter Prappel,
der hat ein Pferd,
das gibt dir einen Apfel – seinen Stuhlgang –
auf den Mund.“

“Are you coming to Kappel,
there lives Peter Prappel,
who has a horse,
that will shit you an apple
onto your mouth.”

== Economy and infrastructure ==
=== Transport ===
The village lies at the crossing of two important roads: the road from the Rhine, Koblenz/Boppard to Trier, the one that was later called the Hunsrückhöhenstraße (Bundesstraße 327), and the road from Kirn on the river Nahe by way of Kirchberg to the Moselle and Zell (Bundesstraße 421). The crossing in Kappel is slightly staggered. Both roads are underlain by old Roman and pre-Roman (Celtic) roads. When the Hunsrückhöhenstraße was being upgraded not long before the Second World War, it was realigned, bypassing the village to the east.

=== Established businesses ===
The village still has 5 full-time farmers, and also 15 more who farm as a secondary source of income.

Among the municipality's businesses are a building firm (above-ground), a fence-building firm (formerly a wireworks), an artistic glassmaking business, a poultry farm with attached farmer's shop, a tax advisory office and an inn.

The municipality's other workers are mainly commuters who work in neighbouring towns and municipalities such as Kirchberg, Simmern and Kastellaun, and at Frankfurt-Hahn Airport. Some commuters even go as far afield as the Frankfurt Rhine Main Region to the east or Neuwied to the north.

== Famous people ==
The most famous Kappeler was the Knochenflicker Pies (Knochenflicker – “bone mender” – being a kind of folk medic). The first one, Jakob Pies (b. 1860 in Dorweiler), had “married into” Kappel in 1895. His son Robert Pies (1902–1973), was the last genuine Knochenflicker in Kappel. Both were farmers who, in the tradition of the Hunsrück Pies family, also practised chiropractic, focusing especially on setting joints right again. The patients came from afar to undergo treatment. From the sometimes painful treatment supposedly came the German word piesacken (a verb meaning “badger”), but this is likely folk etymology. The Pies family's history is documented at the Vorderhunsrückmuseum in Dommershausen.
