= Gehlweiler =

- Municipality
- Coat of arms

- Location of Gehlweiler within Rhein-Hunsrück-Kreis district
- Interactive map of Gehlweiler
- Location within Germany Location within Rhineland-Palatinate
- Coordinates: 49°53′0″N 7°27′58″E
- Country: Germany
- State: Rhineland-Palatinate
- District: Rhein-Hunsrück-Kreis
- Municipal assoc.: Kirchberg

Government
  - Mayor (2019–24): Kurt Aßmann

Area
  - Total: 4.5 km^{2} (1.7 sq mi)
- Elevation: 290 m (950 ft)

Population (2025-12-31)
  - Total: 209
  - Density: 46/km^{2} (120/sq mi)
- Time zone: UTC+01:00 (CET)
  - Summer (DST): UTC+02:00 (CEST)
- Postal codes: 55490
- Dialling codes: 06765
- Vehicle registration: SIM
- Website: www.gehlweiler.de

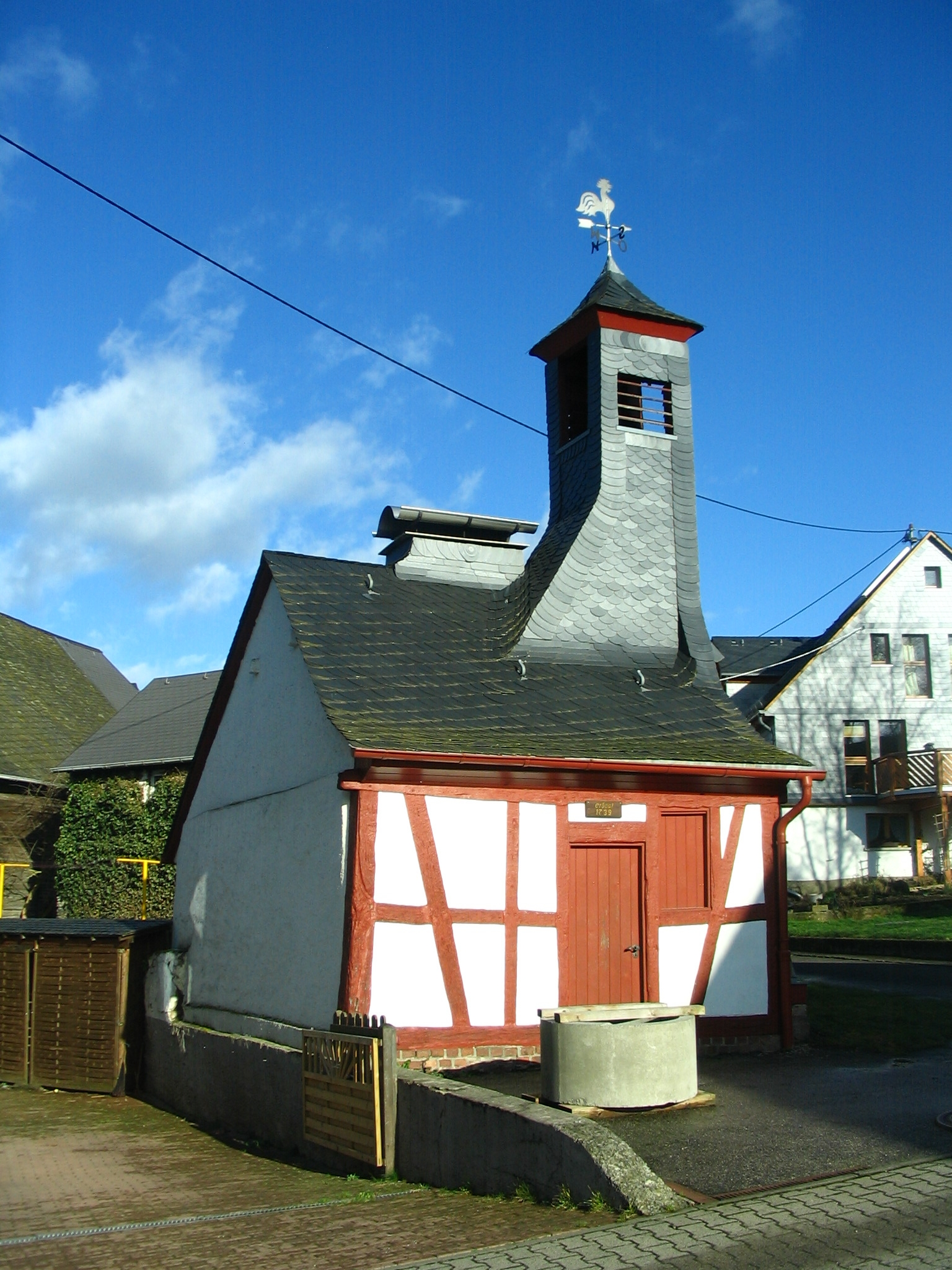
Old bakehouse with belltower

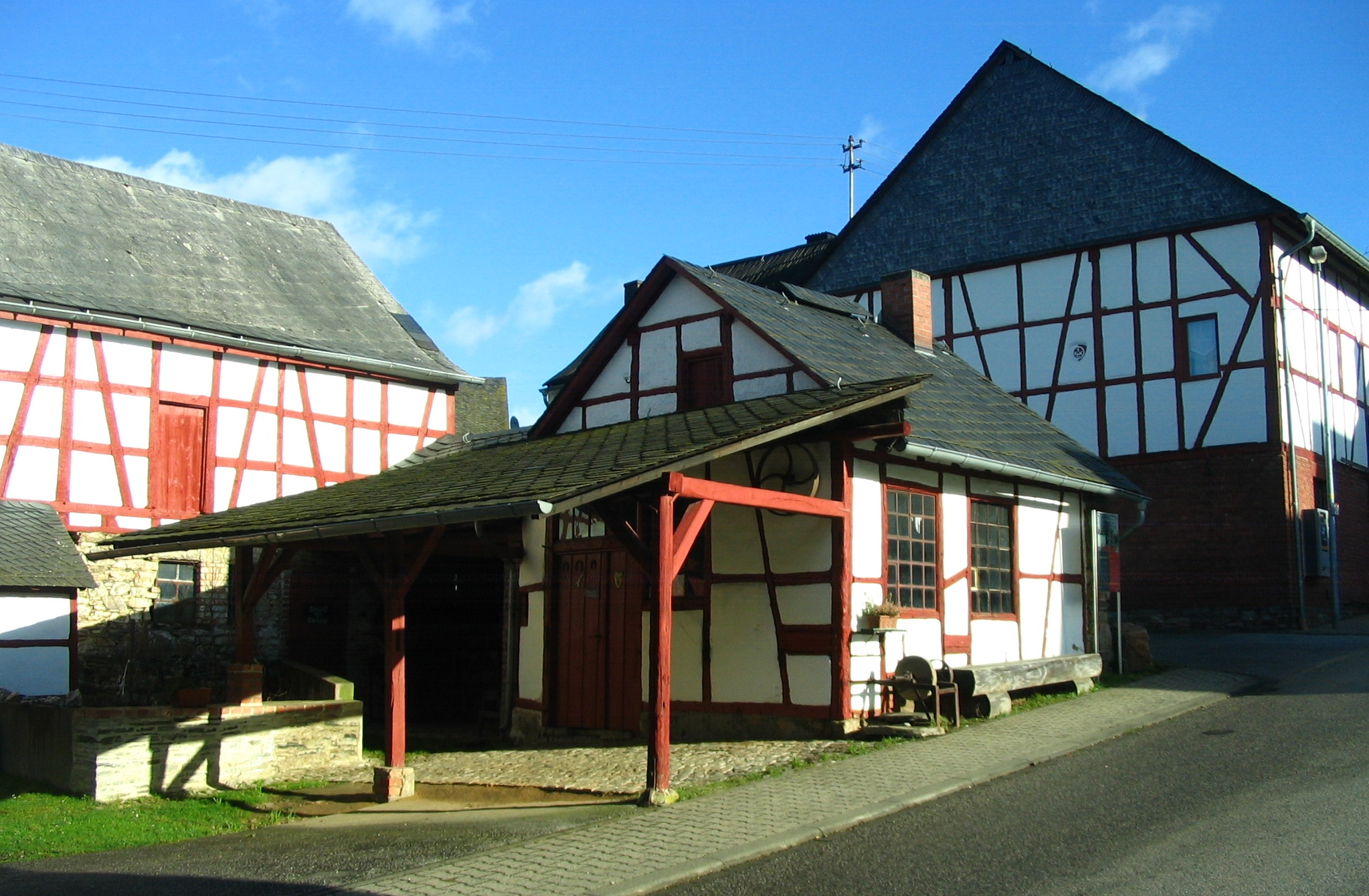
The Simon smithy from the film Heimat by Edgar Reitz

Gehlweiler (German pronunciation: [ˈɡeːlvaɪlɐ]) is an Ortsgemeinde – a municipality belonging to a Verbandsgemeinde, a kind of collective municipality – in the Rhein-Hunsrück-Kreis (district) in Rhineland-Palatinate, Germany. It belongs to the Verbandsgemeinde of Kirchberg, whose seat is in the like-named town.

== Geography ==
=== Location ===
The municipality lies on the western slope of the Soonwald, a heavily wooded section of the west-central Hunsrück. Through the village flows the Simmerbach, on whose other side lies the Lützelsoon plateau. Gehlweiler's population is 254 and its area is 450 ha, of which 249 ha is wooded.

== History ==
Gehlweiler's history goes back to the 9th and 10th centuries, with the first descriptive mention being found in the Urkunden zur Willigskirche bei Auen (“Documents at Saint Willigis’s Church near Auen”) from the Church's Sobernheim rural chapter. Its history is also tightly bound with the former Castle Koppenstein. This castle was under the ownership of the formerly powerful Sponheim dynasty, and as the outlying village, Gehlweiler belonged to the “Koppenstein”, and was thereby itself a Sponheim holding. In 1317, Gehlweiler had its first documentary mention as Gelwilre.

Until 1575, Gehlweiler was assigned to the parish of Getzbach (nowadays Seesbach) and thereafter belonged to the area of the Amt of Gemünden. In 1707, Gehlweiler passed into Baden’s ownership, without bringing about any appreciable change in the villagers’ lives, however.

Beginning in 1794, Gehlweiler lay under French rule. In 1815 it was assigned to the Kingdom of Prussia at the Congress of Vienna. Since 1946, it has been part of the then newly founded state of Rhineland-Palatinate. Furthermore, since 1970, the Ortsgemeinde of Gehlweiler has lain under the authority of the Verbandsgemeinde of Kirchberg, which was put together in that year in the course of administrative restructuring in Rhineland-Palatinate from 40 municipalities from the former Ämter of Büchenbeuren, Gemünden and Kirchberg along with two Ortsgemeinden from the Amt of Rhaunen, and eventually also the town of Kirchberg, which had originally not been part of any Verbandsgemeinde.

== Politics ==
=== Municipal council ===
The council is made up of 6 council members, who were elected by majority vote at the municipal election held on 7 June 2009, and the honorary mayor as chairman.

=== Mayor ===
Gehlweiler's mayor is Kurt Aßmann, and his deputies are Jürgen Schmidt and Thomas Krysa.

=== Coat of arms ===
The German blazon reads: Über einem von Gold und Blau mit drei Bogen geteilten Schildfuß in blaugoldenem Schach ein roter Pfahl, belegt mit einem schwarzen Raben.

The municipality's arms might in English heraldic language be described thus: The base per fess invected of three Or and azure, above which chequy of twenty-four of the same a pale gules charged with a raven sable.

The “chequy” pattern and the raven charge are drawn from the arms formerly borne by the Knights of Koppenstein. Gehlweiler belonged to the Sponheim Amt of Koppenstein, which for a while was pledged to the Knights. After Castle Koppenstein had fallen into disrepair, the Koppenstein Amtsschultheiß lived in Gehlweiler. He also bore the “chequy” pattern and the raven in his 18th-century seal. The base refers to the quarrystone bridge over the Simmerbach, a three-arched structure from the 18th century.

== Culture and sightseeing ==
=== Buildings ===
The following are listed buildings or sites in Rhineland-Palatinate’s Directory of Cultural Monuments:

- Hauptstraße – three-arched bridge over the Simmerbach, 17th or 18th century
- Hauptstraße 16 – former tithe house; timber-frame house, partly solid, Eternit-slated, half-hipped roof, marked 1769 and 1869, timber-frame barn; whole complex of buildings
- Hauptstraße 19 – bakehouse; one-floor plastered building, partly timber-frame, 19th century

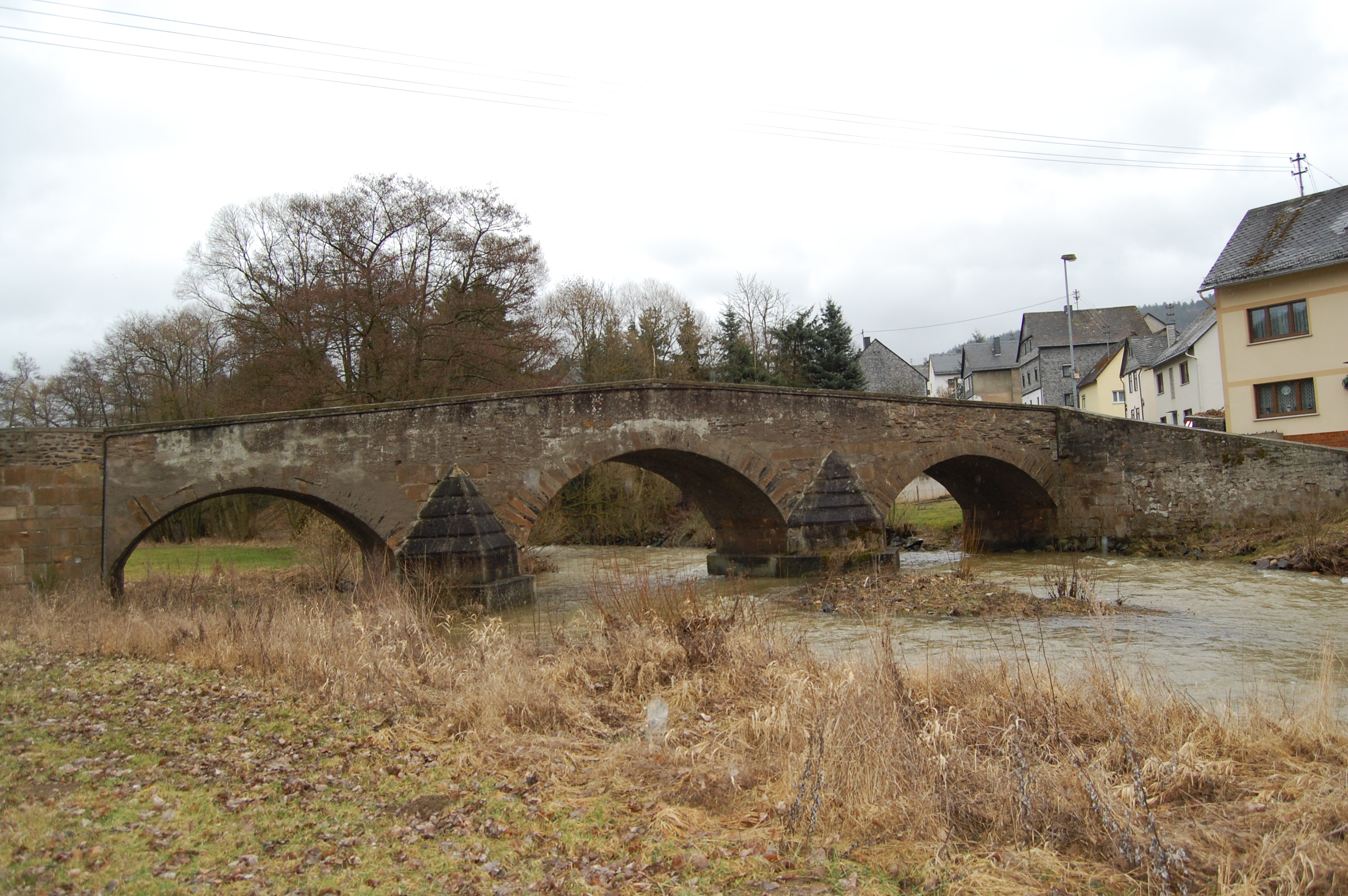
Hauptstraße: three-arched bridge

- Hauptstraße 26 – estate complex; building with half-hipped roof, timber framing plastered, 1821, timber-frame commercial wings, 19th century, timber-frame smithy
- Hauptstraße 43 – timber-frame house, 18th or 19th century
- Beside Hauptstraße 46 – former bakehouse; one-floor timber-frame building, 17th or 18th century
- Franzenmühle (mill), north of the village, on the millrace/Simmerbach – timber-frame house, partly slated, half-hipped roof, marked 1822, timber-frame shed; whole complex of buildings with millrace

==== Other buildings ====
Also of interest is the Castle Koppenstein ruin, from which there is a good view of all the nearby villages (among others, Gemünden, Rohrbach and Henau).

At the Alte Schmiede ("Old Smithy") and its accompanying house, nowadays in private ownership, parts of the film Heimat by Edgar Reitz were made, which made the Hunsrück well known to the world beyond.
