= Dickenschied =

- Municipality
- Coat of arms

- Location of Dickenschied within Rhein-Hunsrück-Kreis district
- Interactive map of Dickenschied
- Location within Germany Location within Rhineland-Palatinate
- Coordinates: 49°54′02″N 7°25′12″E
- Country: Germany
- State: Rhineland-Palatinate
- District: Rhein-Hunsrück-Kreis
- Municipal assoc.: Kirchberg

Government
  - Mayor (2019–24): Volker Bender-Praß

Area
  - Total: 5.86 km^{2} (2.26 sq mi)
- Elevation: 400 m (1,300 ft)

Population (2025-12-31)
  - Total: 720
  - Density: 120/km^{2} (320/sq mi)
- Time zone: UTC+01:00 (CET)
  - Summer (DST): UTC+02:00 (CEST)
- Postal codes: 55483
- Dialling codes: 06763
- Vehicle registration: SIM
- Website: www.dickenschied.de

Dickenschied (German pronunciation: [ˈdɪkn̩ʃiːt]) is an Ortsgemeinde – a municipality belonging to a Verbandsgemeinde, a kind of collective municipality – in the Rhein-Hunsrück-Kreis (district) in Rhineland-Palatinate, Germany. It belongs to the Verbandsgemeinde of Kirchberg, whose seat is in the like-named town.

== Geography ==
=== Location ===
The municipality lies on a ridge in the Hunsrück five kilometres south of Kirchberg. To the east lies the Simmerbach valley, to the west lies the Kyrbach valley and to the south looms a hill region called the Lützelsoon.

== History ==
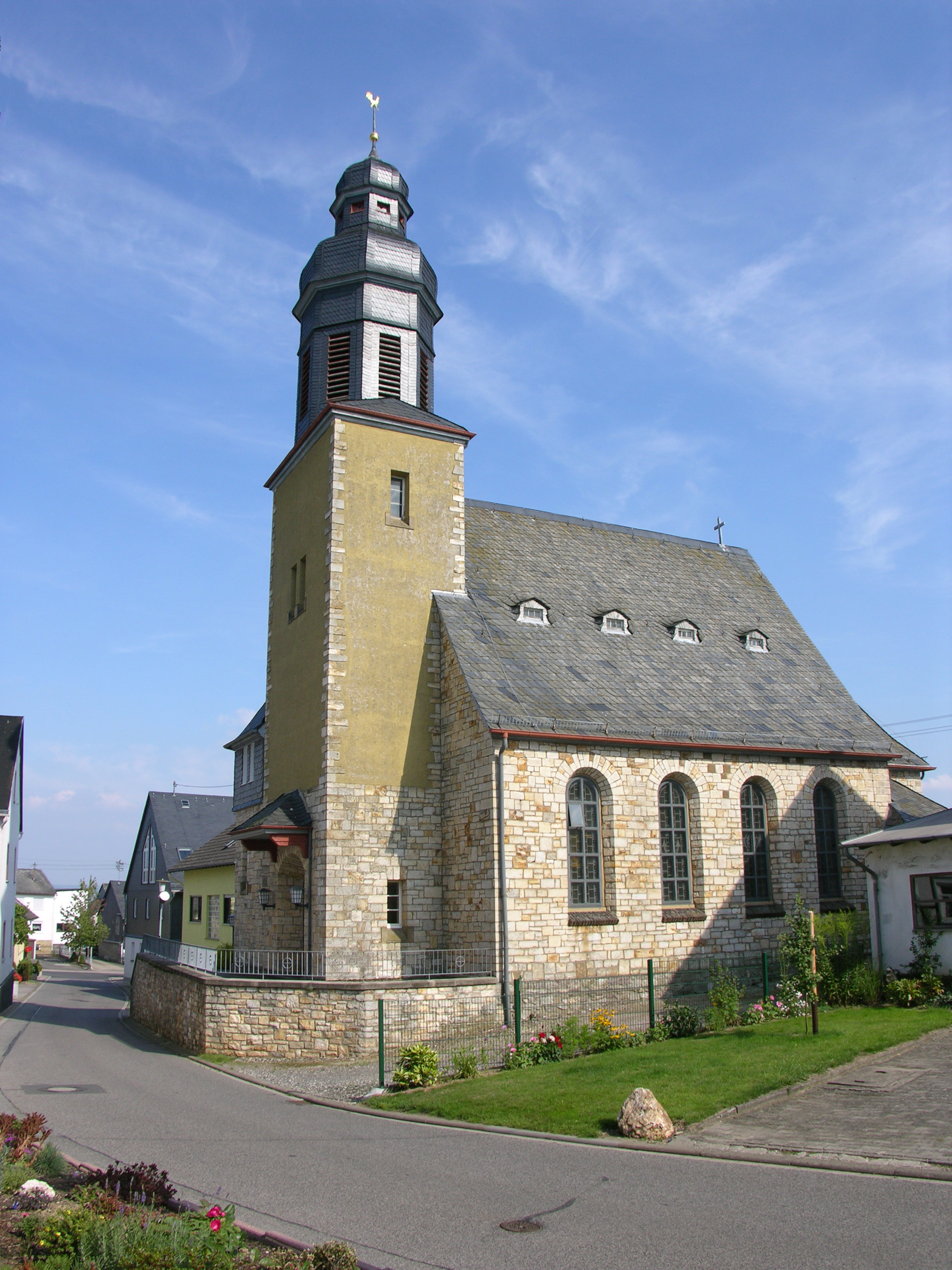
Evangelical Parish Church

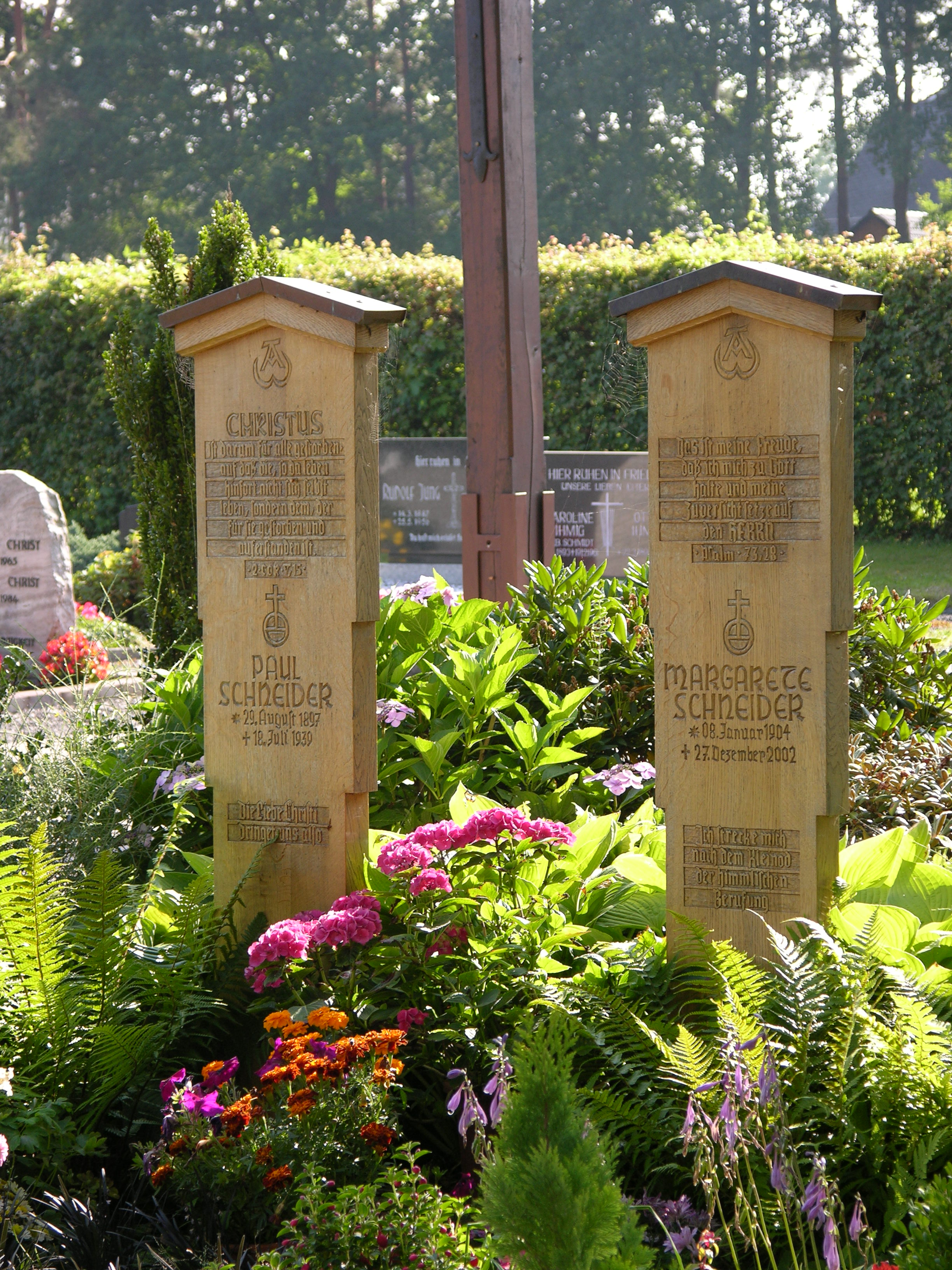
Paul and Margarete Schneider's grave

=== Prehistory and early history ===
The Dickenschied area was settled as early as the New Stone Age, as witnessed by finds in the neighbouring municipalities of Woppenroth and Gemünden. After the Stone Age and the Bronze Age, the Hunsrück's, and thereby also Dickenschied's, prehistory and early history was marked by the Celts (600-50 BC), the Romans (50 BC-AD 300) and the Franks (300-1000). Within Dickenschied's municipal limits, Celtic burying grounds may be found in both the “Bannholz” and “Saliswäldchen” wooded areas. From Roman times, a one-handled jug from the 2nd century has been found, and the old “Roman road” bears witness to this time, too. The outlying, now vanished, village of Werschweiler, to the northeast, was a Frankish centre from about 800. Dickenschied itself is thought to date from no later than 1100, for villages founded in the time of the forest clearing in Merovingian times (600-750) quite commonly have names ending in —schied, —hausen, —rod or —feld. It is believed to have been part of the Frankish Nahegau, a county.

=== Middle Ages ===
Although such a founding date is assumed, there is no actual document to confirm Dickenschied's existence until the one that crops up from 1186, namely a bull from Pope Urban III within the framework of a directory of holdings at the Karden Collegiate Foundation. Landholdings and rights in Dicheset were confirmed in this document. Other early spellings of the village's name were Dickesceit, Dickenszeit, Dickescheit and Dickenschiedt, until the village settled on Dickenschied in 1481. This form appeared mostly in bills of sale. Early estates were the Meisterhof, Ginemanshof and Filmanshof. These estates, and the village itself, at first belonged to the Collegiate Foundation, then later to the greater parish of Kirchberg. From the 8th to the 12th centuries, Dickenschied was under Kostenz's care. Until 1124 it belonged to the Count of Dill, and in the end it passed to the Counts of Sponheim and the Barons of Schmidtburg.

=== Early modern times ===
In the 17th century, Dickenschied sustained a great fire in 1649 during the Thirty Years' War, and other wars brought hardship as well. It was said that there was “neither chicken nor goat to be found anymore”. About 1688, only 13 families were still living in Dickenschied (10 Evangelical and 3 Catholic; the Reformation was introduced in 1557 and the first known Evangelical clergyman was Wolfgang Reis 1591-1605). The Dickenschieder Fest with its veneration of the Fourteen Holy Helpers has been held since 1747 as an important Hunsrück church festival, sometimes drawing more than 3,000 pilgrims from near and far. It is always observed on the Sunday before Whitsunday. In the 18th century, Dickenschied belonged to Baden until 1796, whereafter it spent almost 20 years under French sovereignty. In this time, all government documents were issued in the French language. In 1815, however, Dickenschied was assigned to the Kingdom of Prussia at the Congress of Vienna.

=== Early 20th century and world wars ===
Local developments in the 20th century were at first characterized by great infrastructural measures such as the waterworks, electricity, sewer laying and roadbuilding. Also, the outlying settlement of Scheidbachsiedlung vanished “from the face of the earth”. The First World War’s toll of 20 fallen and the Second World War’s toll of almost 70 either fallen or missing brought great pain into many Dickenschied families’ lives. After the Nazis’ Machtergreifung, the local Reichstag elections on 5 March 1933, before Gleichschaltung, saw Dickenschied's “silent majority” vote for anyone but the NSDAP, despite the flood of Nazi propaganda.

=== Postwar era ===
Since the Second World War, the village's appearance has changed somewhat with new building developments, and there have been great structural changes in working life, particularly in agriculture.

In a dale southwest of the village, slate was mined at the “Auf Allern” mine until the mid-20th century. Today, it is a demonstration mine.

=== Vanished villages ===
==== Werschweiler ====
Dickenschied once had outlying settlements that now no longer exist. Werschweiler, which lay northeast of the village, had its first documentary mention in 1299: a knight named Sibido von Schmidtburg donated his holdings at Werschweiler to the Ravengiersburg Monastery. The settlement was obliged, together with Rohrbach, Kerweiler (another ghost village, this one formerly part of Kappel) and Dickenschied, to see to the maintenance of the priest who had come to live at the rectory in 1317. Werschweiler vanished in the Thirty Years' War. The bell from 1686 still bore the inscription: “Dickenschied und Werschweiler ließen mich gießen” (“Dickenschied and Werschweiler had me poured”).

==== Scheidbach ====
Even today, a street name in the village recalls the Scheidbach, a settlement at the forks of the two streams that also bear this name, about 1.5 km east of the village. The earliest attestation of this place comes from 1778, when Jakob Schein “von der Schißbach bey Dickenschied” (“from the Schißbach near Dickenschied”) asked the Badish lordship for leave to bring an old gristmill back into use and also make it habitable. The settlement is supposed to have been Schinderhannes’s hideout for quite a while. In the 19th century in this settlement, notorious throughout the Hunsrück for stock theft and begging, lived two farming families, and in primitive cabins at least six other families. To get rid of these disagreeable people, some of whom were Romani (or perhaps Yeniche?), the municipality kept buying up houses, one by one. By late November 1909, the last inhabitants had moved to Dickenschied. The last house was burnt down because it was infested with vermin. Nanny Lambrecht’s novel Armsünderin describes a woman’s life in the Scheidbach.

=== Religion ===
By 1317, there was already a chapel in Dickenschied when the village was raised to a parish-like status called Pfarrvikarie with its own priest.

Today's church was consecrated in 1844 as a simultaneous church. The simultaneum ended in 1912, although the Evangelical congregation enjoyed "guest rights" at the Catholic church until 1916, whereafter they held their services at the Evangelical schoolhouse. Work on the Evangelical church began at Whitsun in 1914, and Evangelical services have now been held there since 22 December 1918.

Dickenschied, which belongs to the Evangelical church district of Simmern-Trarbach, was where from 1934 to 1937 Paul Schneider worked as an Evangelical clergyman. He was murdered on 18 July 1939 at Buchenwald.

Today, the Evangelical and Catholic Churches each count some 340 members in Dickenschied.

== Population ==
In 2008 the population was reported to be 739 residents .

== Politics ==
=== Municipal council ===
The council is made up of 12 council members, who were elected at the municipal election held on 7 June 2009, and the honorary mayor as chairman.

=== Mayor ===
Dickenschied's mayor is Volker Bender-Praß.

=== Coat of arms ===
The German blazon reads: Schild geteilt, oben gespalten, vorne in Gold ein grünes Eichenblatt, hinten in Schwarz ein goldenes schwebendes Passionskreuz; unten blau-golden geschacht.

The municipality's arms might in English heraldic language be described thus: Per fess, in chief per pale Or an oakleaf vert and sable a cross Latin of the first, and in base chequy of the first and azure.

The charge on the sinister (armsbearer's left, viewer's right) side above the line of partition is a Latin cross, called a “Passion cross” in the German blazon. The cross's meaning is twofold: it refers to the Fourteen Holy Helpers and the former pilgrimage site on the one hand, and on the other to Paul Schneider, the Evangelical pastor who once worked in Dickenschied and who was murdered at Buchenwald. The charge on the dexter (armsbearer's right, viewer's left) side, the oakleaf, stands for Dickenschied's wealth of woodlands. Below the line of partition is a “chequy” pattern, recalling the village's onetime allegiance to the County of Sponheim.

=== Town partnerships ===
Dickenschied fosters partnerships with the following places:

- Felsőtárkány, Heves, Hungary since 19 August 1993

Felsőtárkány lies near Eger. The partnership arose from the aftermath of Hurricane Wiebke, which in late February and early March 1990 wrought untold destruction in Germany. To deal with the great amount of cleaning up that lay before the authorities in the local woodlands, the Soonwald and the Lützelsoon, many workers were brought in from Sweden, Austria and Hungary, and in particular from Felsőtárkány, who were lodged in Dickenschied's holiday houses for a whole year. From the first private contacts grew a relationship that in the end turned into a partnership between the villages. There are relations between several clubs. Dickenschied also supports a music club, two kindergartens and a school in Felsőtárkány.

== Culture and sightseeing ==
=== Buildings ===
The following are listed buildings or sites in Rhineland-Palatinate’s Directory of Cultural Monuments:

- Catholic Church of the Fourteen Holy Helpers (Kirche Vierzehn Nothelfer), Kirchstraße – Romanesque Revival aisleless church, 1842-1844
- Evangelical church, Lindenschieder Straße – Baroque Revival quarrystone aisleless church, 1914-1918; whole complex of buildings
- Graveyard – cast-iron grave cross, Rheinböllen Ironworks, latter half of the 19th century

== Economy and infrastructure ==
The former economic sectors of agriculture and slate mining have almost completely disappeared. Two full-time agricultural operations and seven roofing businesses, some specializing in slate roofing, are far from the way things were. All together, there are 35 businesses in the municipality.
