= Nanny Lambrecht =

German writer (1868–1942)

Nanny Lambrecht (born Anna Lambrecht; 15 April 1868, in Kirchberg, Rhein-Hunsrück – 1 June 1942, in Schönenberg, Ruppichteroth), was a German writer who authored approximately 25 novels, several volumes of published short stories, books for young people, and a nonfiction book.

== Biography ==
Her two older sisters were born in the United States, where their parents had emigrated in 1854, the year they married. Her father learned shoe repair and business in Boston, Massachusetts, and Philadelphia, Pennsylvania, respectively, and her uncle was in the leather trade. The Lambrechts later returned to Kirchberg, where Nanny was born on 15 April 1868. Her father died at the age of 52, leaving his family in poverty.

Nanny Lambrecht attended a workshop for teachers in Xanten on the Lower Rhine, and completed her training in Belgium in order to learn French. In 1889, she was hired at the bilingual school in Malmedy in the former Prussian Rhine province, where she practiced for 13 years. She began to write and publish her stories. In Malmedy she met her Walloon life companion, Fanny Bierens. From some remarks in letters that suggest a romantic relationship, folklorist Susanne Hose concludes that it "was more than just one of convenience between unmarried women." They left Malmedy in 1904 and lived in Aachen. Lambrecht established herself as a freelance writer on the growing Catholic book and magazine market.

After World War I, Lambrecht moved from occupied Aachen to Bad Honnef, where she founded a literary and musical society. She published many novels and short stories, the last a 1936 novel which contained some concessions to Nazi ideology. She died in 1942, the year she retired.

== Works and reception ==
After the release of her collection of short stories "What Happened in the Fens ..." (1904) and the Eifel novel The House in the Moor (1906), literature reviews described Lambrecht as the "Catholic Viebig", after German author Clara Viebig. Lambrecht considered this label inappropriate and offensive. False rumors had claimed that Clara Viebig's novel Das Weiberdorf, also situated in the Eifel region, had been banned by the Catholic Church.

Lambrecht's novel The Statue Lady (1908) takes place in Malmedy and the surrounding villages of the former Prussian Wallonia. In this work, she addresses the German government's actions to Germanize the Walloon minority. At the same time, it deals with issues of women's emancipation.

The focus of Lambrecht's novel Armsünderin (1909), set in the Hunsrück settlement of Scheidbach, is a young woman from a family of tinkers who is pregnant by the son of a wealthy farmer and, rejected by all the villagers, brings her illegitimate child into the world in a quarry. The topic of single motherhood, as well as issues of birth control and abortion addressed in Notwehr, the Novel of the Unborn (1911), were continually discussed at the beginning of the 20th century.

Following the publication of Armsünderin the latent "Catholic literature dispute", part of a larger controversy surrounding the position of Catholics in the Protestant-dominated German Empire, flared up again. A reprint of the novel in the reform-oriented Catholic magazine Hochland by the publisher Karl Muth angered the conservative Ultramontanes. As a result, Lambrecht was excluded from the Catholic book market.

The themes of commitment for the socially weak and advocacy for the emancipation of women run through all of Lambrecht's works. With a strong regional focus and long dialect passages, she was closely related to the literary folk art movement. During World War I, she published several novels about war. In the 1920s she focused on historical novels and entertainment.

== Bibliography ==
- What Happened in the Fens ... Stories from the Eifel Region and the Walloon Region (1904)
- Hausiererkinder – Narrative (1905)
- The House on the Moor – Eifel (1906)
- The Land of Night (1908)
- The Statue Lady! Novel of a Marriage and of a People (1908)
- Allsünderdorf – New Short Stories and Sketches (1908)
- Armsünderin – Novel from the Hunsrück (1909)
- The New Mother – A Woman Book (1909)
- The Girls – A School Tragedy in Four Acts (1910)
- The Seekers (1911)
- Brother Man – Tales from the Ship of Fools (1912)
- Self-Defense – The Novel of the Unborn (1912)
- The Marriage Village – Novel from the Belgian Countryside (1913)
- The Great Duchess (1913)
- The Iron Joy (1915)
- The Flat of the Walloons (1915)
- The Prisoner of Belle – Jeanette (1916)
- The Hell Experiences (1916)
- The Hollaprinzeß (1917)
- From Klappergasse – Stories (1917)
- The Smile of Susanna – Novel from the Hunsrück (1918)
- Before Awakening (1920)
- The Secret Guest (1920)
- The Blonde, the Brown, the Black – A Travel Novel From Better Days (1922)
- The Children of Cain (1922)
- Stories from History (1922)
- In the Twelfth Hour (1924)
- The Rape of the King's Castle (1926)
- Overstolz – A Rhenish Novel from the Present (1927)
- The Lady in Black – An Event on Lake Lugano (1929)
- Anne-Brigitte – Time (1936)
