= Paul Schneider (pastor) =

Prussian pastor (1897–1939)

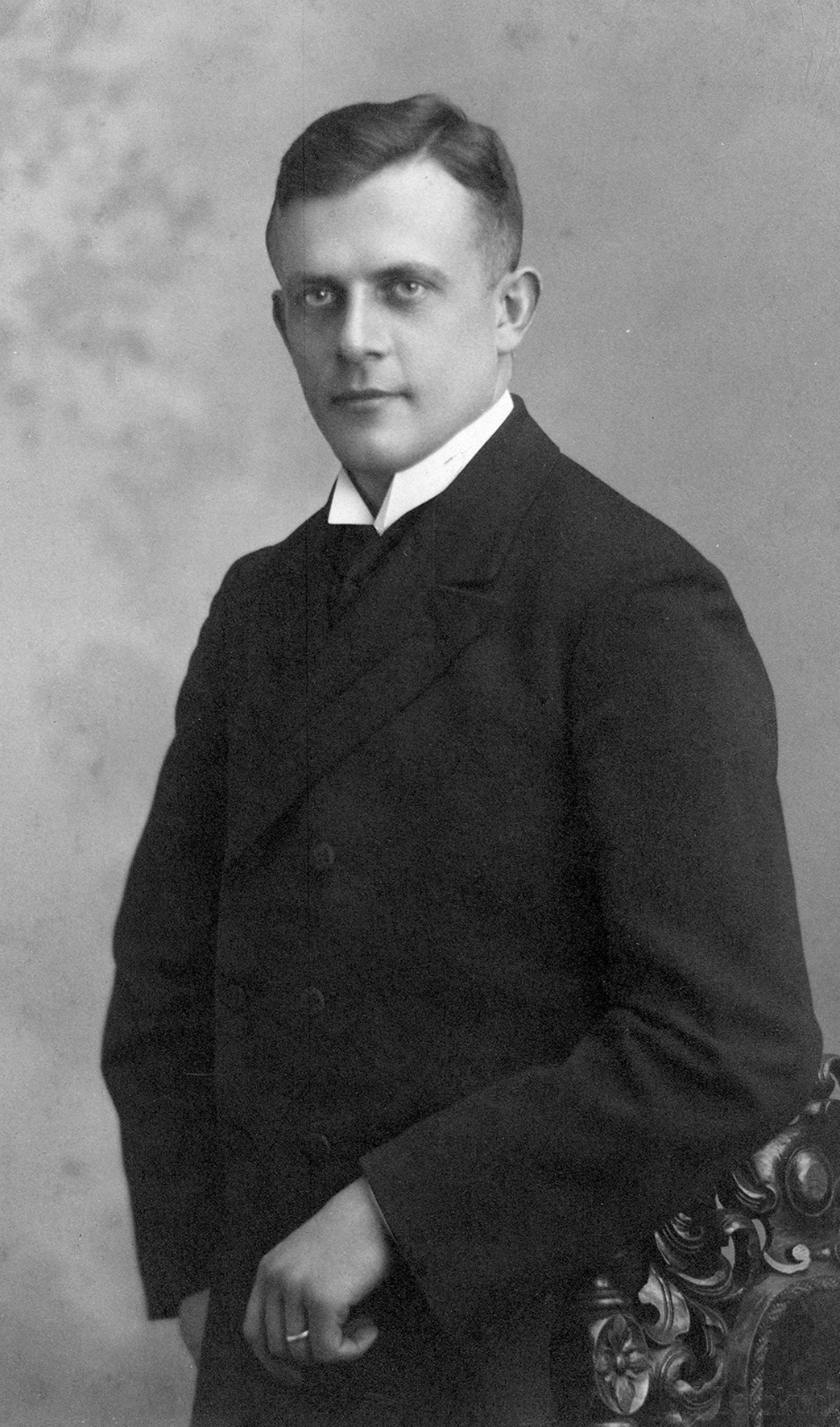
Paul Schneider as pastor, 1925

Paul Robert Schneider (August 29, 1897 – July 18, 1939) was a German pastor of the Evangelical Church of the old-Prussian Union who was the first Protestant minister to be martyred by the Nazis. He was murdered with a strophanthin injection at the concentration camp of Buchenwald. He is called the "Preacher of Buchenwald".

== Early life ==
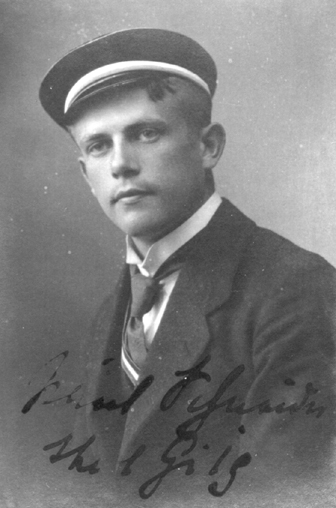
Paul Schneider as a student, 1920

Schneider was born in Pferdsfeld near Bad Sobernheim, Germany in 1897, to Gustav-Adolf Schneider and Elisabeth Schnorr. Schneider studied theology at the universities of Gießen, Marburg and Tübingen. He was ordained in Hochelheim near Wetzlar in 1925.

== Nazi opposition ==
On the occasion of the funeral of a Hitler youth boy a Nazi official said in his speech that the deceased would now be member of the heavenly storm of Horst Wessel. Pastor Schneider responded that he did not know of a heavenly storm of Horst Wessel. The two men exchanged sharp words. Schneider was imprisoned for one week in June 1934.

== Imprisonment ==
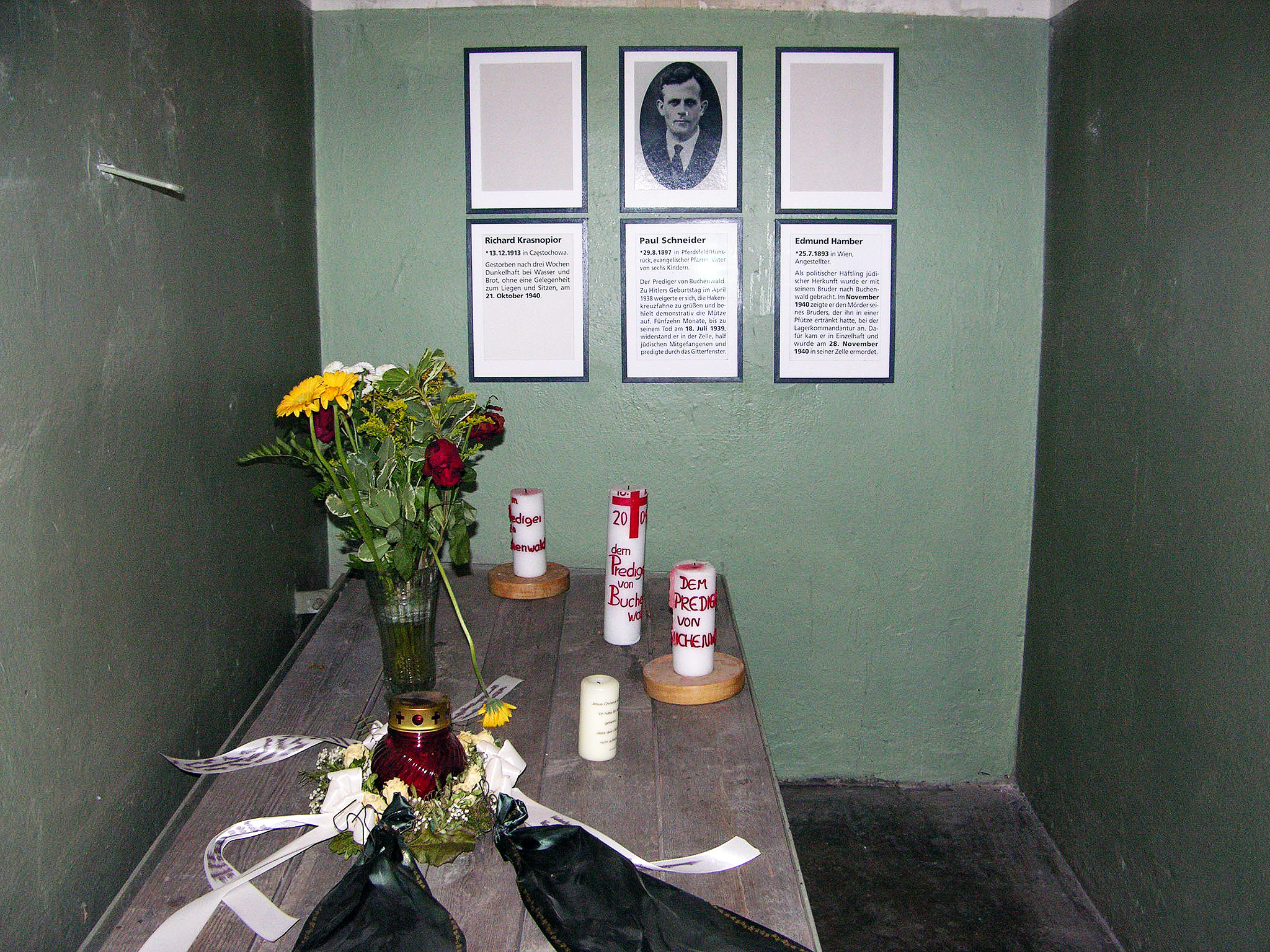
A cell in the Buchenwald memorial site, which is now dedicated, among others, to Paul Schneider

While in prison he refused to salute the swastika flag. On an Easter Sunday, when thousands of prisoners were assembled for mustering, despite being severely handicapped by previous torture he climbed to the cell window and shouted: "Comrades, listen to me. This is Pastor Schneider. People are tortured and murdered here. So the Lord says, 'I am the resurrection and the life!'" His speech was interrupted by guards.

After June 1938 the only reason for Schneider's imprisonment in Buchenwald was his refusal to accept the order to permanently leave his congregations in Dickenschied and Womrath. He could have been released from the KZ at any time, if he had agreed to accept this order. However, even under severe torture, he refused to do so.

== Literature ==
- Claude R. Foster jr.: Paul Schneider, the Buchenwald apostle: a Christian martyr in Nazi Germany; a sourcebook on the German Church struggle; SSI Bookstore, West Chester University, West Chester, Pennsylvania 1995, ISBN 1-887732-01-2, E Book and E Book.
  German edition: Paul Schneider. Seine Lebensgeschichte. Der Prediger von Buchenwald. Translated by Brigitte Otterpohl. Hänssler, Holzgerlingen 2001, ISBN 3-7751-3660-6.
- Albrecht Aichelin: Paul Schneider. Ein radikales Glaubenszeugnis gegen die Gewaltherrschaft des Nationalsozialismus. Kaiser, Gütersloh 1994, ISBN 3-579-01864-7.
- Margarete Schneider: Paul Schneider – Der Prediger von Buchenwald. Neu herausgegeben von Elsa-Ulrike Ross und Paul Dieterich. SCM Hänssler, Holzgerlingen 2009, ISBN 978-3-7751-4996-9.
