= Rohrbach, Rhein-Hunsrück =

Rohrbach
- Municipality
- Coat of arms

- Location of Rohrbach within Rhein-Hunsrück-Kreis district
- Interactive map of Rohrbach
- Location within Germany Location within Rhineland-Palatinate
- Coordinates: 49°53′09″N 7°25′17″E
- Country: Germany
- State: Rhineland-Palatinate
- District: Rhein-Hunsrück-Kreis
- Municipal assoc.: Kirchberg

Government
  - Mayor (2019–24): Jutta Heck-Bähren

Area
  - Total: 3.77 km^{2} (1.46 sq mi)
- Elevation: 400 m (1,300 ft)

Population (2025-12-31)
  - Total: 167
  - Density: 44.3/km^{2} (115/sq mi)
- Time zone: UTC+01:00 (CET)
  - Summer (DST): UTC+02:00 (CEST)
- Postal codes: 55490
- Dialling codes: 06765
- Vehicle registration: SIM
- Website: www.rohrbach-hunsrueck.de

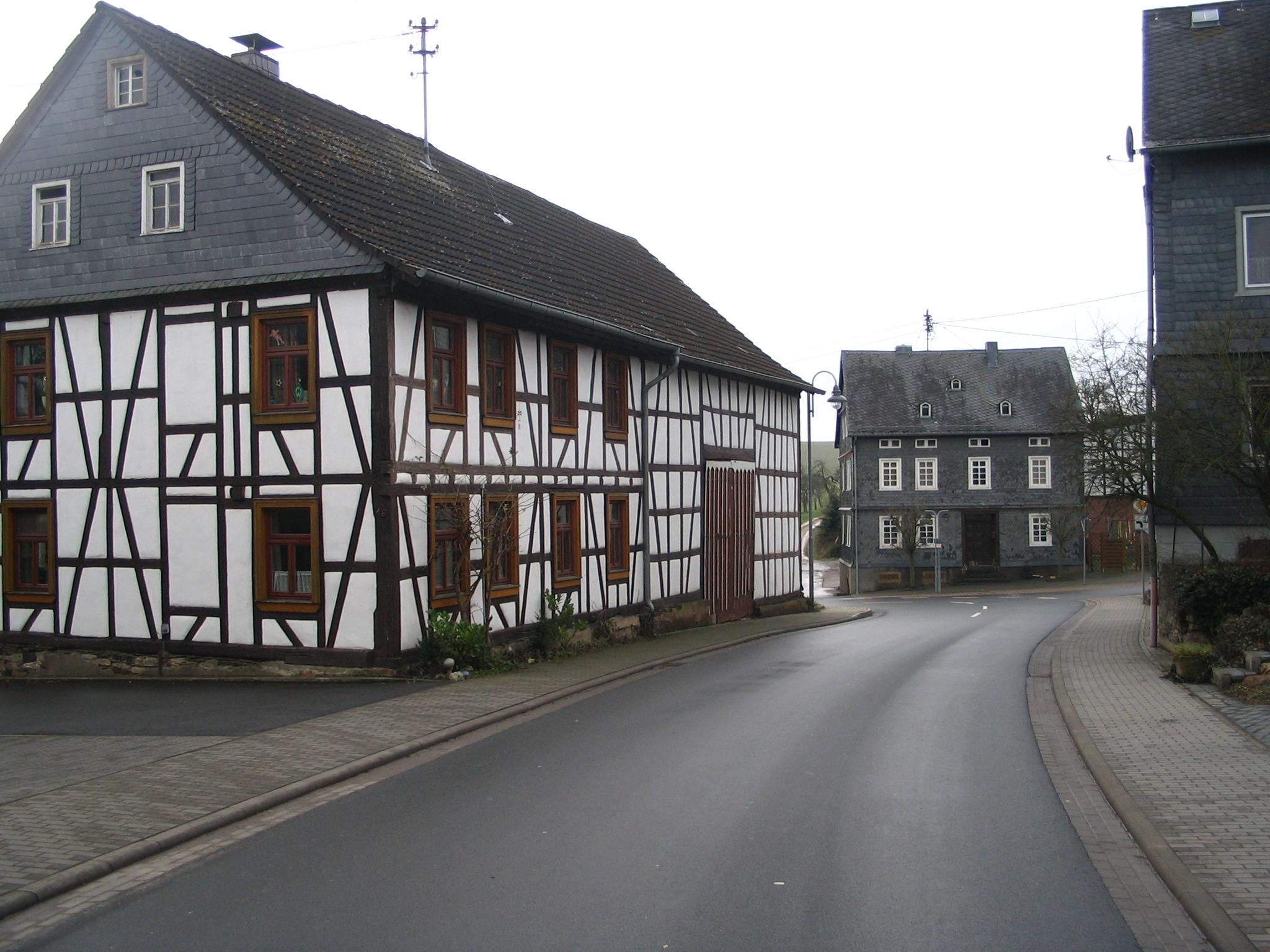
Hauptstraße. In the house in the middle of the picture, the indoor scenes of the film Schinderhannes were made, as were those of Haus Simon in the first part of the Heimat series

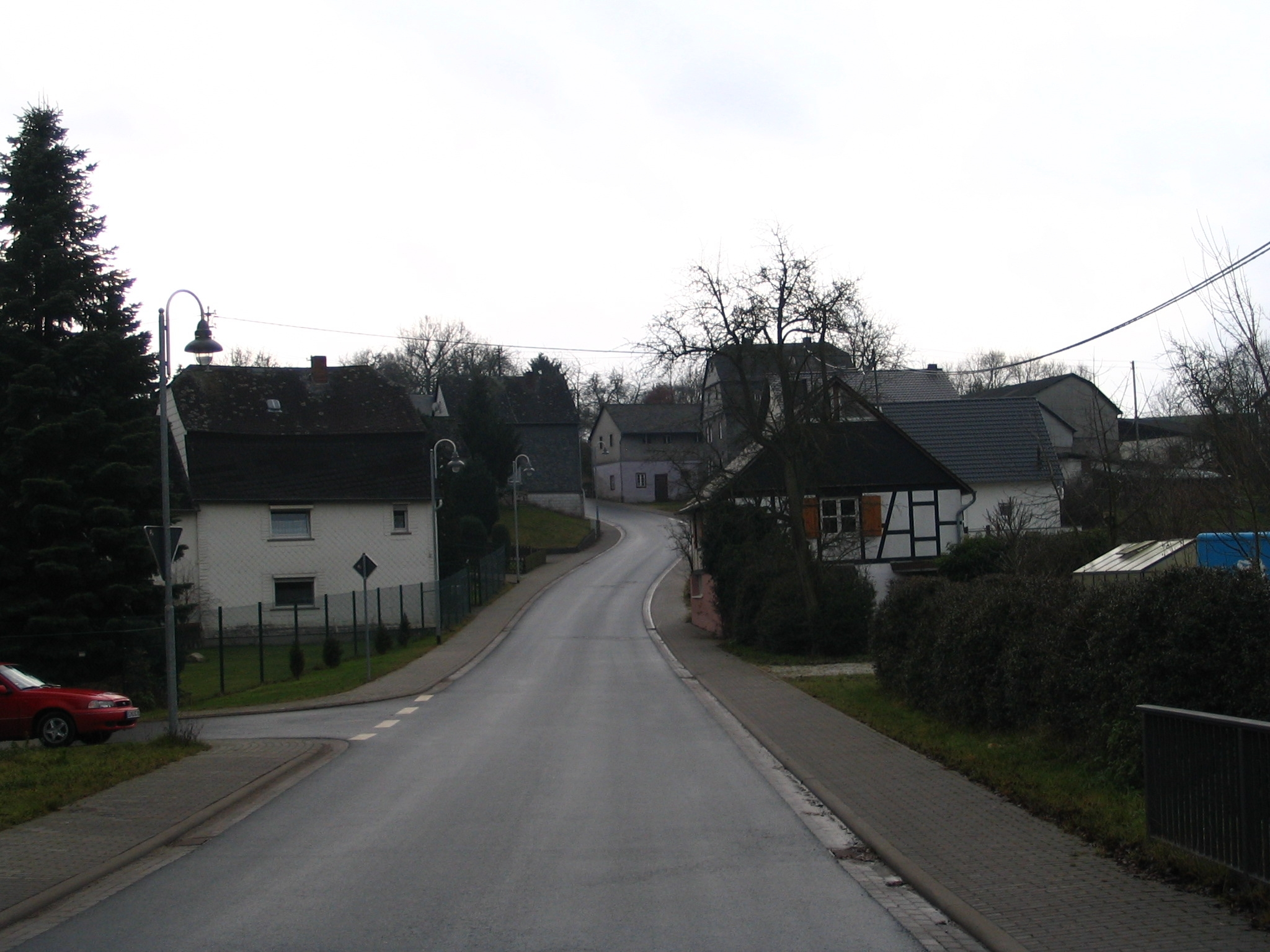
Hauptstraße. View towards the south into the part of Rohrbach once held by the “Further” County of Sponheim

Rohrbach (German pronunciation: [ˈʁoːɐ̯bax]) is an Ortsgemeinde – a municipality belonging to a Verbandsgemeinde, a kind of collective municipality – in the Rhein-Hunsrück-Kreis (district) in Rhineland-Palatinate, Germany. It belongs to the Verbandsgemeinde of Kirchberg, whose seat is in the like-named town.

== Geography ==
=== Location ===
The municipality lies on the Lützelsoon, a plateau forming part of the Hunsrück, roughly 6 km south of Kirchberg. Currently there are about 200 inhabitants. The municipal area measures 3.76 km², of which 86 ha is wooded. Its greatest elevation is 387 m above sea level.

== Name ==
The municipality's name comes from the reed bed (Phragmites, the Common Reed; called Schilfrohr in German) that once grew along the edge of the like-named brook (Bach in German), the Rohrbach.

== History ==
It is believed that Rohrbach was founded in the early 11th century. Its first documentary mention dates from 27 September 1304 and is found in the compilations of the archives kept by the Counts of Sponheim. The report of a session in Dill reads thus:

Walram Count of Zweibrücken and Ruprecht Count of Virneburg decide as chosen arbiters between Johann Adviser of the Knights of Heinrich Lord of Sponheim, Johann von Braunshorn, on the following point of dispute: because of the forbidden wine (Order of Avoidance of Wine) at Rohrbach, Wannenweiler and Dickenschied, the Seneschal Gottfried of Enkirch and Konrad of Maitzborn shall hold a hearing of the subjects and officials.
Sealed by: Simon and Johann, Counts of Sponheim, Ulrich Lord of Hanau and Ludwig Count of Rieneck.

Two further documentary mentions came in 1317 and 1340. In the former document, Count Emich of Sponheim, Archdeacon of the Diocese of Liège and titular parish priest at Kirchberg, endowed benefices in ten villages to maintain chaplains. In the latter document, Johann of Dhaun transferred to the Knight of Sötern a waldgravial fief, the so-called Torsengut (a circular or elliptical shape) of Rohrbach.

Rohrbach may have belonged to the County of Sponheim from the time of its founding. Nonetheless, this ended when the House of Sponheim died out in 1437 and the village passed to the Counts of Veldenz and the Margraves of Baden. Through marriage, the Veldenz inheritance passed to the Counts Palatine of Simmern-Zweibrücken. About 1600, the southern part of Rohrbach belonged, along with six Hintersassen (roughly, “dependent peasants”) to the “Further” County of Sponheim and, locally, to the Amt of Dill, while the northern part belonged to the Badish Oberamt of Kirchberg; the boundary between these two territories was the village's namesake brook itself, the Rohrbach. Until 1707, the Counts Palatine and the Margraves ruled the county together. Then, the Margraves became the sole rulers of the Oberamt of Kirchberg and thereby Rohrbach's landholders. In October 1794, the village, along with all German lands on the Rhine’s left bank, passed to France. Administration then no longer came from Kirchberg, but rather from the Mairie (“Mayoralty”) of Gemünden. After Napoleonic times, the village was assigned in 1815 to Prussia, and more locally to the Rhine Province.

Since 1946, Rohrbach has been part of the then newly founded state of Rhineland-Palatinate. In the course of administrative restructuring in Rhineland-Palatinate, various former Ämter were merged in 1971, and Rohrbach, along with the Amt of Gemünden, was assigned to the Verbandsgemeinde of Kirchberg.

The greatest rise in Rohrbach's population came about the turn of the 19th century. From 59 villagers in 12 families in 1781, the number of inhabitants grew to 99 in 20 families by 1798, and 207 people by 1840.

== Religion ==
The church built in 1791 belongs to the Evangelical parish, which counts 126 parishioners. The parish, which belongs to the Simmern-Trarbach Church District, was from the Reformation in 1557 until 1766 parochially tied to the Evangelical parish of Dickenschied, and has been once again since 1963. This means that although Rohrbach is a parish in its own right, the minister at Dickenschied is also responsible for the parish of Rohrbach. Catholics, who make up about one fifth of the population, have the right to celebrate Mass at the Evangelical church, which they do especially when there is a funeral or wedding ceremony to be performed.

The church building measures 12.85 m × 7.55 m. The furnishings inside – pews, gallery, altar – are still the ones from the time of building. The pulpit, on the other hand, is older than the church itself, having been made in 1701 in nearby Mengerschied. In keeping with the Reformed tradition, the presbyters’ seating is found opposite the congregation and the pulpit in the apse. The Baptismal basin and the chalice come from about 1800. Two bronze bells had to be surrendered in the First World War; today two steel bells, poured in 1923, can be found in the ridge turret. These were given a bronze inside lining in 2002.

== Politics ==
=== Municipal council ===
The council is made up of 6 council members, who were elected by majority vote at the municipal election held on 7 June 2009, and the honorary mayor as chairman.

=== Mayor ===
Rohrbach's mayor is Jutta Heck-Bähren.

=== Coat of arms ===
The municipality's arms might in English heraldic language be described thus: Per pale Or a bend gules and azure a bend sinister wavy abased argent issuant from which two reeds each leafed of three and fructed of the first.

The composition on the dexter (armsbearer's right, viewer's left) side is the arms formerly borne by the Margraviate of Baden, a former landholder in Rohrbach. The composition on the sinister (armsbearer's left, viewer's right) side is canting for the municipality's name, “Rohrbach”, which literally means “Reedbrook”.

== Culture and sightseeing ==
=== Buildings ===
The following are listed buildings or sites in Rhineland-Palatinate’s Directory of Cultural Monuments:

- Evangelical church, Hauptstraße 10 – Early Classicist aisleless church, 1791; whole complex of buildings with surrounding field
- Gartenfeld 3 – timber-frame Quereinhaus (a combination residential and commercial house divided for these two purposes down the middle, perpendicularly to the street), partly slated, 19th century
- Hallgarten 2 – timber-frame house, first third of the 19th century
- Hauptstraße 1 – building with hipped mansard roof, timber framing slated, earlier half of the 19th century; whole complex of buildings with barn
- Hauptstraße 15 – bakehouse; timber-frame building, partly solid or slated, 1840
- Hohlweg 1 – timber-frame Quereinhaus with knee wall, 19th century

=== Clubs ===
Four clubs involve themselves in village life: the Evangelical Women's Aid (Evangelische Frauenhilfe in Deutschland), a music club, the Countrywomen's Association (Deutscher Landfrauenverband) and the fire brigade.

=== Films made in Rohrbach ===
In 1958, the film Schinderhannes, in which, among others, Curd Jürgens, Maria Schell, Siegfried Lowitz and many Rohrbachers appeared, was made in Rohrbach under Helmut Käutner’s direction.

In 1981 and 1982, the indoor scenes of Haus Simon in the first part of the Heimat series were made in Rohrbach. The house where this was done, Sooste, had already been chosen for the film Schinderhannes.

== Economy and infrastructure ==
Formerly, most of the inhabitants earned their living at agriculture or slate mining. There were several craft businesses: locksmith, smith, cobbler and wainwright. Also, there were a shepherd and a swineherd. However, young people were always having to move away, to places like the Saar or the Ruhr area to find work.

As of 2006, there are only four full-time farmers, and two more who work the land as a sideline; there were still 10 full-time farming operations in 1966 and several operated as a sideline. As well as these concerns, there are a cattle trading business, a timber forwarder, a pottery and wood workshop, a pedicurist, a guide dog trainer and a general service business. Nevertheless, commuters are the majority, working in the surrounding area.

There were once several bakehouses in Rohrbach, in which families baked their bread. One is still sometimes used as a bakehouse. The rest of the time, it serves, as in neighbouring villages, as a gathering place where the music club or the church choir can practise, or the village youth can meet.
