= Niederheimbach =

- Municipality
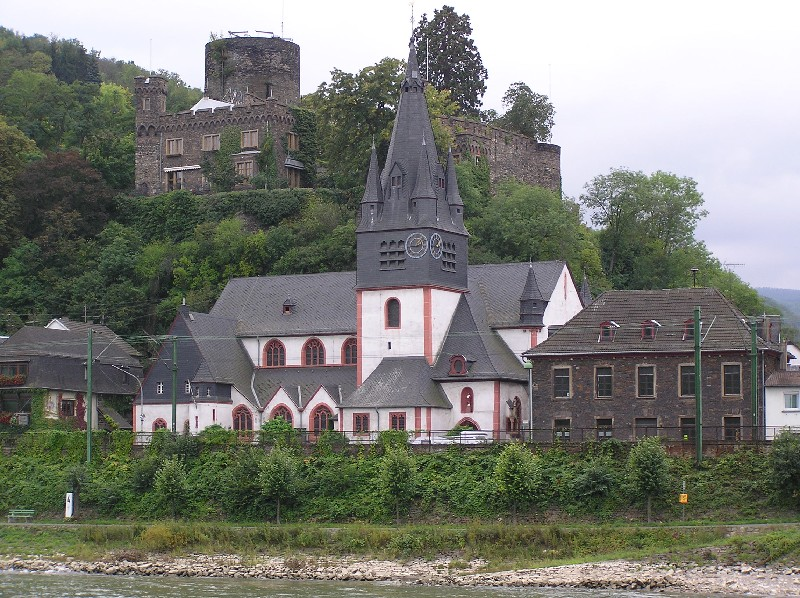
- Catholic Parish Church of the Assumption of Virgin Mary and Heimburg

- Coat of arms

- Location of Niederheimbach within Mainz-Bingen district
- Interactive map of Niederheimbach
- Location within Germany Location within Rhineland-Palatinate
- Coordinates: 50°02′04″N 07°48′28″E
- Country: Germany
- State: Rhineland-Palatinate
- District: Mainz-Bingen
- Municipal assoc.: Rhein-Nahe

Government
  - Mayor (2026–29): Marion Pohl (SPD)

Area
  - Total: 7.38 km^{2} (2.85 sq mi)
- Elevation: 80–618 m (262–2,028 ft)

Population (2025-12-31)
  - Total: 812
  - Density: 110/km^{2} (285/sq mi)
- Time zone: UTC+01:00 (CET)
  - Summer (DST): UTC+02:00 (CEST)
- Postal codes: 55413
- Dialling codes: 06743
- Vehicle registration: MZ
- Website: www.niederheimbach.welterbe-mittelrheintal.de

Niederheimbach (German: [ˌniːdɐˈhaɪmbax]) is an Ortsgemeinde – a municipality belonging to a Verbandsgemeinde, a kind of collective municipality – in the Mainz-Bingen district in Rhineland-Palatinate, Germany.

The winegrowing centre belongs to the Verbandsgemeinde of Rhein-Nahe, whose seat is in Bingen am Rhein, although that town is not within its bounds. Since 2003, Niederheimbach has been part of the Rhine Gorge UNESCO World Heritage Site.

== Geography ==
=== Location ===
Niederheimbach lies between Koblenz and Bingen, right on the Rhine Gorge, only a short way northwest of the Rhine Knee. The place, which is found beneath or east of Bingen Forest (Binger Wald), has a built-up area stretching from 80 to 140 m above sea level. The highest mountain in the municipal area, at 618 m above sea level, is the heavily wooded Franzosenkopf (“Frenchman’s Head”), found south of the built-up area in Bingen Forest.

== Politics ==
=== Municipal council ===
The council is made up of 13 council members, counting the part-time mayor, with seats apportioned thus:

	SPD	CDU	FWG	WNF	Total
2024	5	7	–	–	12 seats
2019	2	3	5	2	12 seats
2014	2	3	5	2	12 seats
2009	1	4	5	2	12 seats
2004	2	3	5	2	12 seats

(as at municipal election held on 9 June 2024)

=== Town partnerships ===
- Champtoceaux, Maine-et-Loire, France since 1981

=== Coat of arms ===
The municipality’s arms might be described thus: Per bend sinister wavy, a bendlet sinister wavy argent surmounting the partition, gules in dexter an abbot’s staff per bend surmounted by a bishop’s mitre, in chief a wheel spoked of six of the first, sable in sinister a bunch of grapes per bend slipped and a grapeleaf in bend sinister Or and issuant from base a lion rampant of the fourth armed, langued and crowned of the second.

== Culture and sightseeing ==
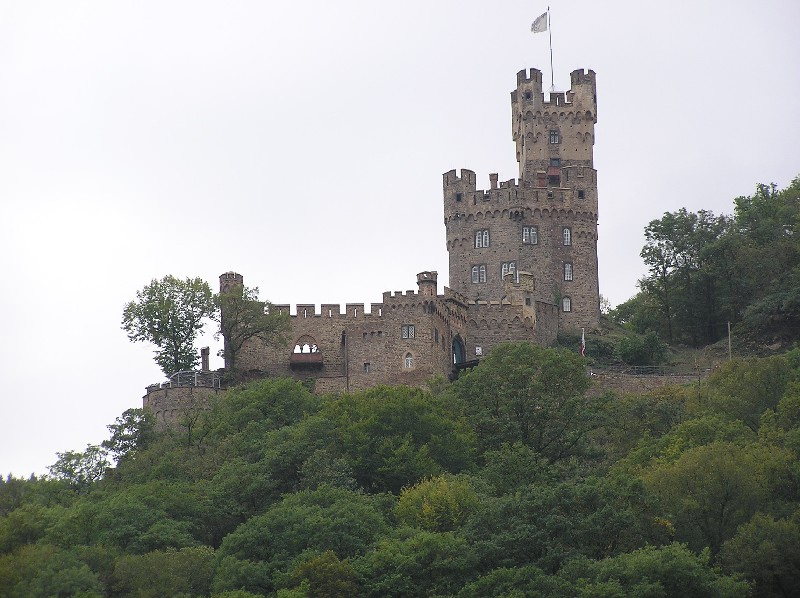
Sooneck Castle

=== Buildings ===
- Sooneck Castle Burg Sooneck, (also called Saneck or Sonneck) stands on a steep slope in the Soonwald (forest) above the municipality. It can be visited on guided tours.
- Another castle, Heimburg, (also called Burg Hoheneck) lies above the municipality. It is privately owned today and cannot be visited.
- Catholic Parish Church of the Assumption of Mary, Niederheimbach.

=== Regular events ===
- On the weekend before Assumption Day (15 August), the bratwurst fair is held.
- Rhein in Flammen ("Rhine in Flames") on the first Saturday in July: Ship tour along the Middle Rhine from Trechtingshausen to Rüdesheim am Rhein with firework displays at Reichenstein Castle, Burg Rheinstein, Assmannshausen, the Mouse Tower, Ehrenfels Castle ruins, Bingen am Rhein with Klopp Castle and the Brömserburg.

Until its closure in the 1990s, the Märchenhain (“Fairytale Grove”) was a tourist attraction. A great number of the fairytale figures were nonetheless restored and have found a new place along an idyllic pathway near the community. There one can see many fairytales, such as Little Red Riding Hood, Hansel and Gretel and others along the Kuhweg (“Cow Way”).

== Economy and infrastructure ==
=== Transport ===
- Right through the municipality runs Bundesstraße 9, linking Mainz with Koblenz.
- Bundesautobahn 61 can be reached roughly 13 km from the community at the Rheinböllen interchange.
- Niederheimbach railway station lies on the Mainz – Koblenz railway line.
- A car ferry across the Rhine links the municipality with Lorch over on the other side.

=== Documents ===
- Picture of Niederheimbach from J.F. Dielmann, A. Fay, J. Becker (draughtsman): F.C. Vogels Panorama des Rheins, Bilder des rechten und linken Rheinufers, Lithographische Anstalt F.C. Vogel, Frankfurt 1833
- Heimburg ruins
