= Rheinburgenweg Trail =

Rheinburgenweg
- Length: 195 km (121 mi)
- Location: Rhineland-Palatinate/Hesse, Germany
- Trailheads: Bingen, Koblenz
- Use: Hiking
- Elevation change: 3,900 m (12,800 ft)
- Highest point: 462 m (1,516 ft)
- Lowest point: 59 m (194 ft)
- Difficulty: Easy
- Season: All year
- Sights: Numerous castles along the Rhine Gorge.
- Hazards: Mountain bikers

Rhine Castle trail - Rheinburgenweg (previously: Rheinburgen-Wanderweg), follows the left side of the Rhine from Bingen to Remagen-Rolandseck and the right side takes the route of the Rheinsteig from Rüdesheim am Rhein to Koblenz.

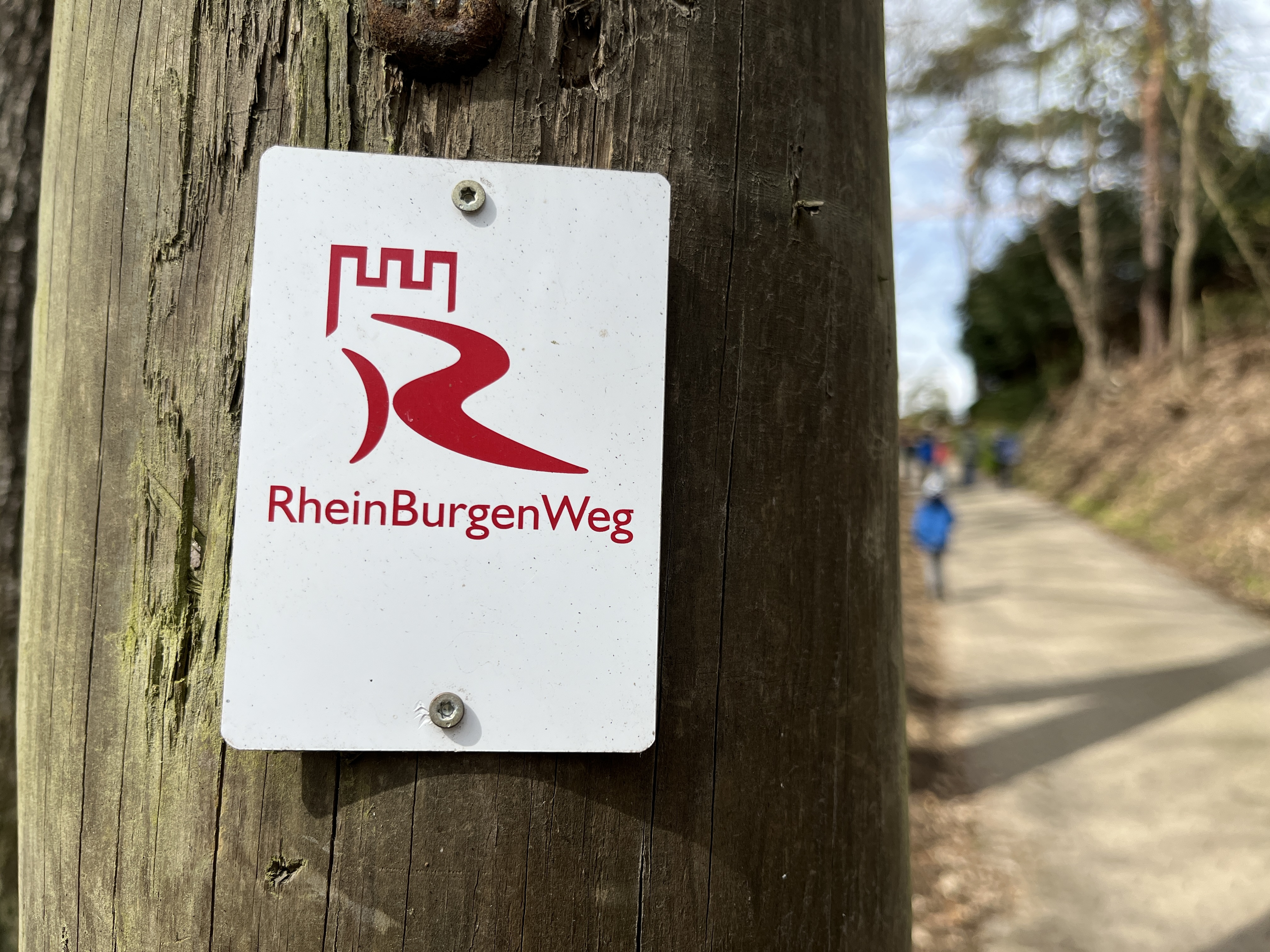
trail marker

== Route and sights of interest ==
- Rüdesheim am Rhein
- Boosenburg
- Brömserburg
- Ehrenfels Castle (Hesse)
- Assmannshausen
- Lorch am Rhein
- Nollig Castle
- Pfalzgrafenstein Castle
- Gutenfels Castle
- Lorelei
- Katz Castle
- Maus Castle
- Marksburg
- Lahneck Castle
- Ehrenbreitstein Fortress
- Koblenz
- Kurfürstliche Residenz
- Stolzenfels Castle
- Königsstuhl von Rhens
- Klostergut Jokobsberg
- Burg Boppard
- Rheinfels Castle
- Schönburg (Rhine)
- Stahleck Castle
- Fürstenberg Castle (Rheindiebach)
- Heimburg in Niederheimbach
- Sooneck Castle
- Reichenstein Castle (Trechtingshausen)
- Rheinstein Castle
- Mouse Tower
- Klopp Castle
- Bingen am Rhein
