= Bingen Forest =

Mountain range in Germany

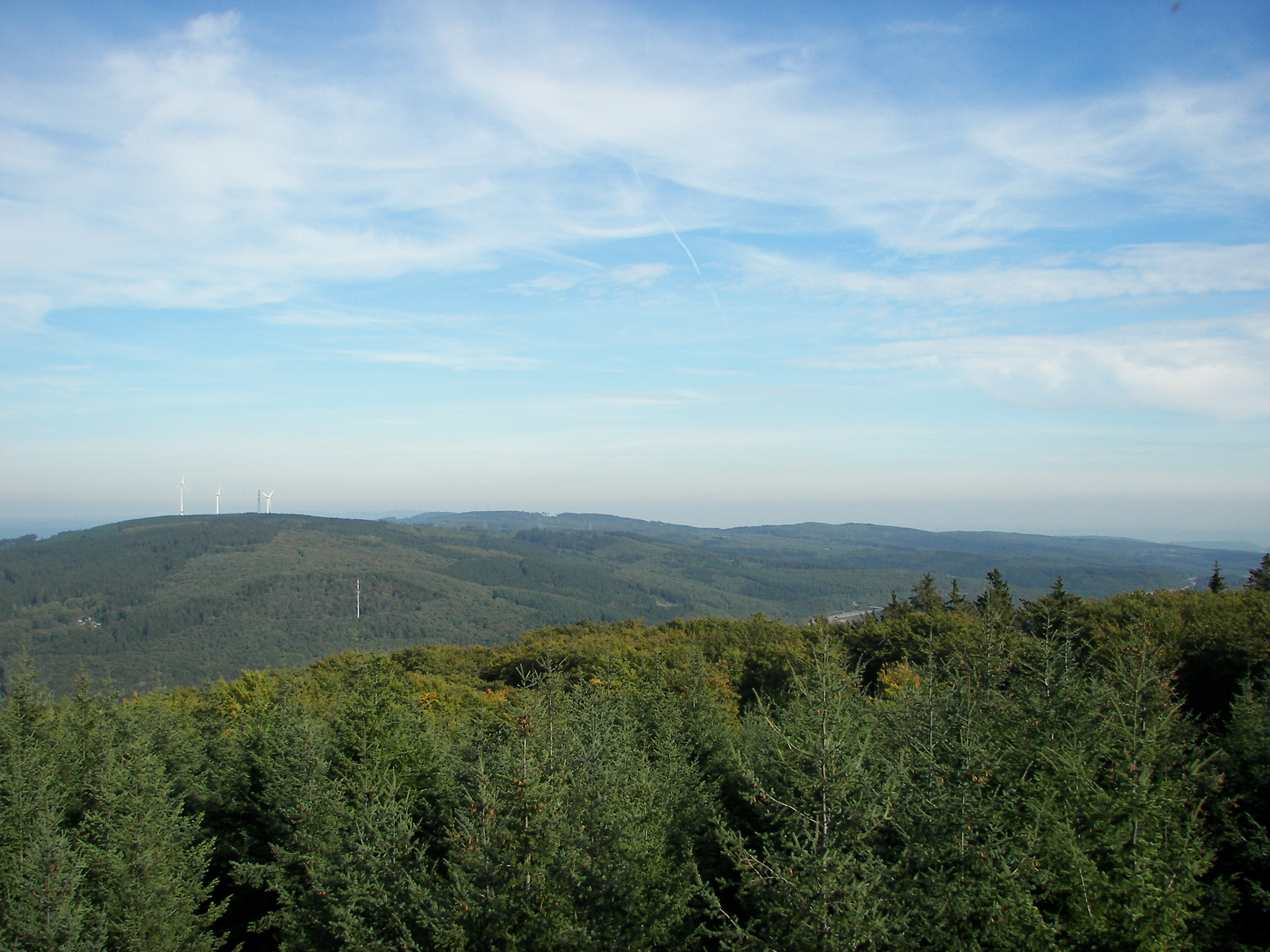
View from the Hochsteinchen over the Hunsrück to Bingen Forest

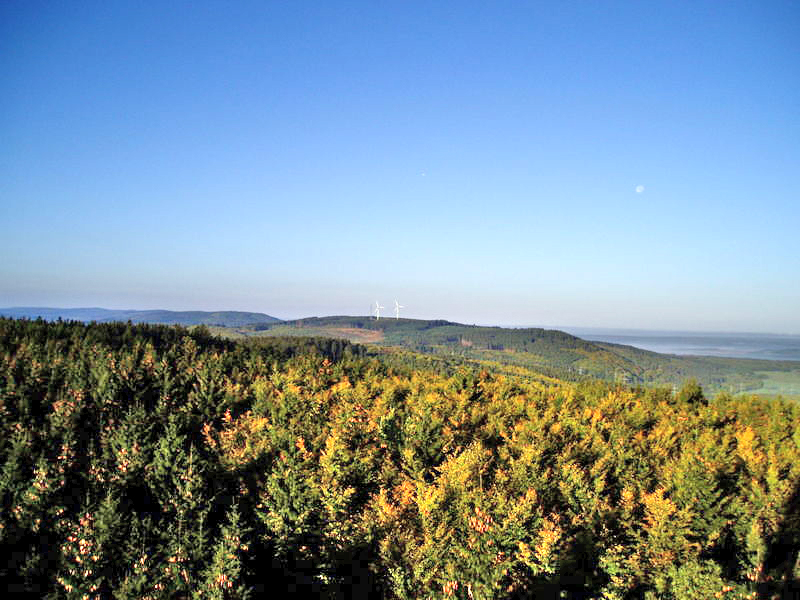
View of the Kandrich from the Salzkopf Tower

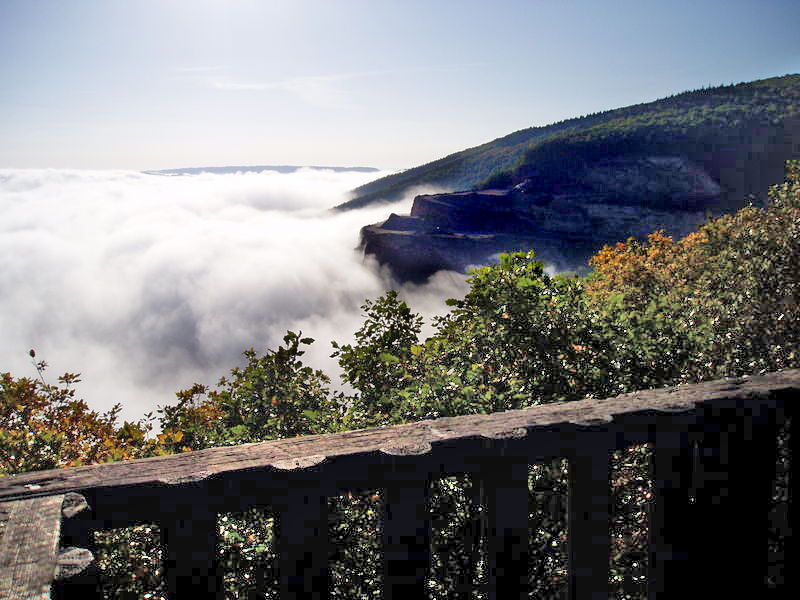
Rheintalnebel of the Siebenburgenblick

The Bingen Forest (German: Binger Wald, pronounced [ˈbɪŋɐ ˈvalt]) is part of the Hunsrück, a low mountain range in the Central Uplands of Germany. It is up to 638.6 m above sea level (NN) and is located in the state of Rhineland-Palatinate.

== Location ==
The landscape of the Bingen Forest lies on the boundary of the counties of Mainz-Bingen (north to southeast), Bad Kreuznach (south) and Rhein-Hunsrück-Kreis (west). It is located between the northeastern end of the Hunsrück main ridge (northwest), the Rhine valley (north and northeast), behind which the Taunus rises, the Rhine Knee near Bingen (east) and the Soonwald (southwest).

== Flora ==
The flora of the densely wooded Bingen Forest, about 40% of which consists of oak but otherwise is a mixed forest, covers an area of around 7,000 hectares, most of which comprises a contiguous area of woodland.

== History ==
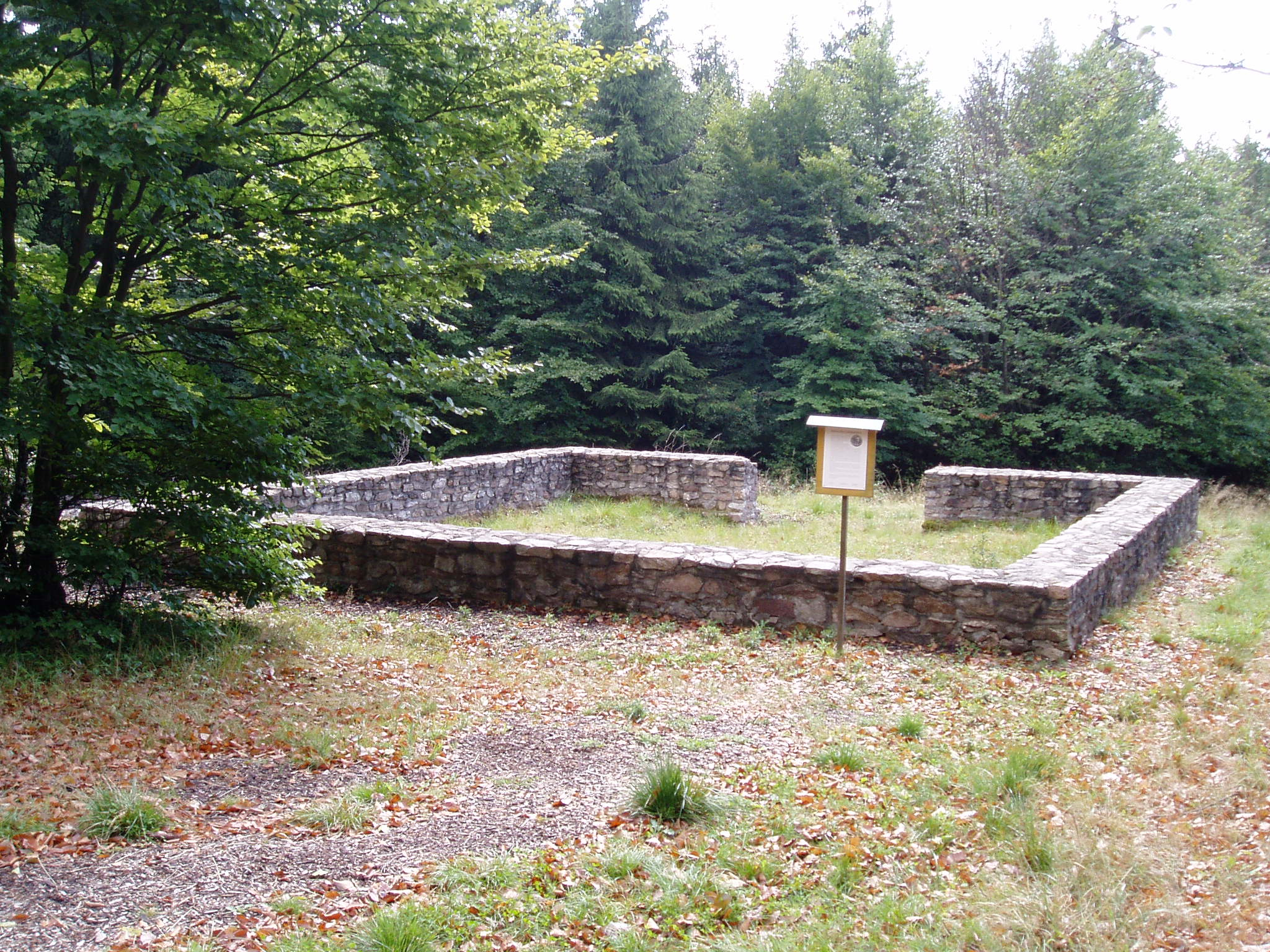
Remains of Roman buildings

Barrows such as that southeast of Dichtelbach, castles and the present-day settlements and villages are evidence that the Bingen Forest and its surrounding area have been settled for a long time. From Roman times the remains of the Villa Rustica have survived as well as parts of a building near the forestry lodge of Forsthaus Lauschhütte. The Ausonius Way runs through the Bingen Forest, which was used as a military link between Bingen and Trier.

During the Cold War there was a radar station on the Kandrich for a Nike Hercules Rocket unit based near Dichtelbach. In 1982 this weapon system was replaced by Patriot air defence rockets, which were then based at the Kandrich in newly built positions. These positions have largely been returned to nature – only earth ramparts are still visible. On the former Patriot rocket station there are now three wind generators.

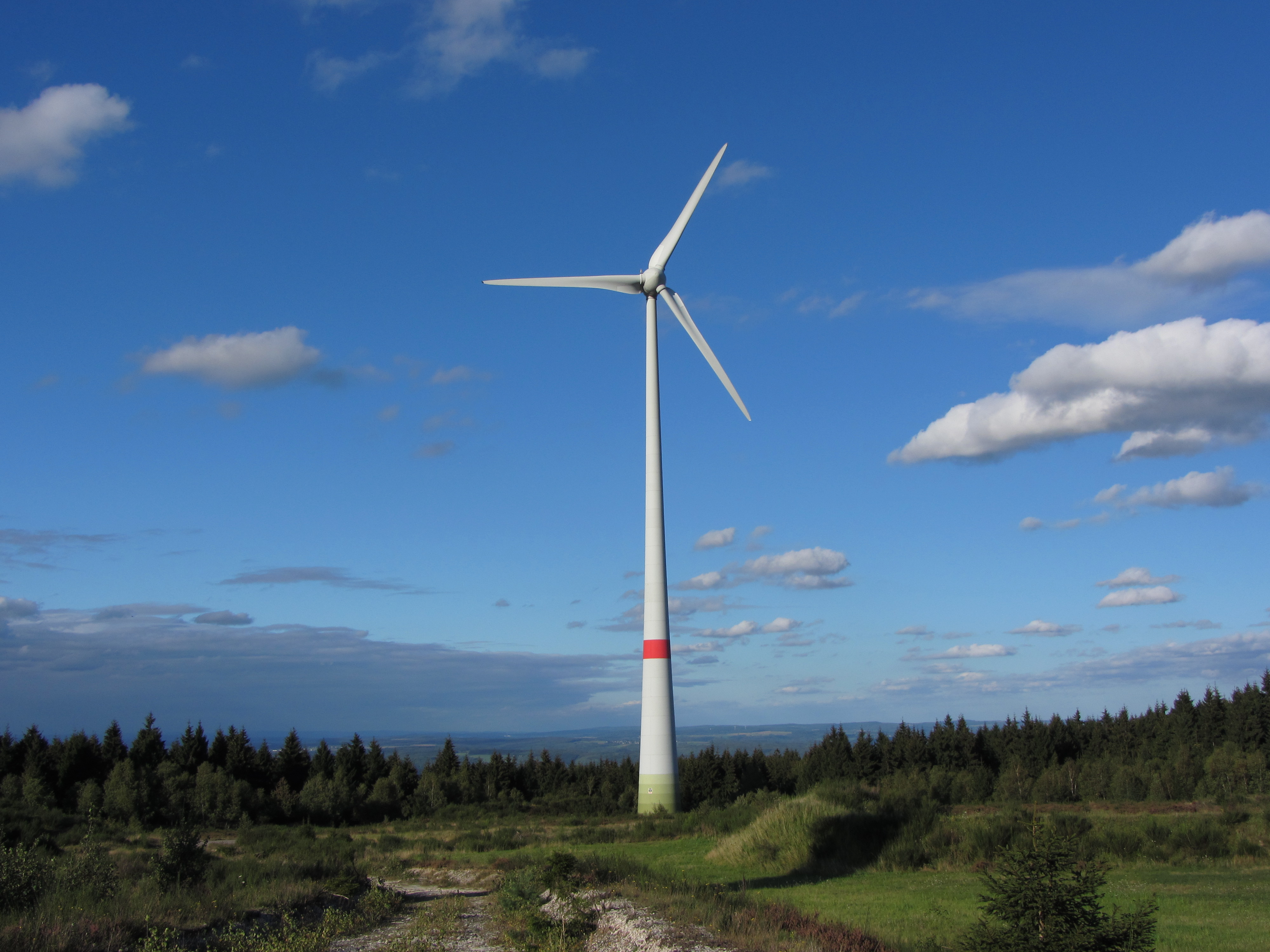
The Kandrich plateau with its wind generator (Typ E-70); view looking northeast to the Rhine

== Hills and uplands ==
The highest mountain in the Bingen Forest is the Kandrich (638.6 m), and its lowest point lies in the Rhine valley near Niederheimbach (80 m). Amongst its highest points are the following (with heights in metres (m) above sea level (NN):

- Kandrich (638.6 m) – with wind generators
- Salzkopf (627.6 m) – with the Salzkopf Tower, a 24 metre high observation tower
- Franzosenkopf (617.3 m)
- Auerhahnkopf (574.1 m)
- Druidenberg (384.7 m)

== Rivers and streams ==
The following rivers and streams rise in, or flow through, the Bingen Forest or its perimeter:

- Guldenbach – tributary of the Nahe, in the southwest and south
- Rhine – river running to the North Sea, in the east and northeast
- Morgenbach – rises in the eastern Salzkopf area, flows eastwards and empties into the Rhine near Reichenstein Castle

== Settlements ==
The settlements surrounding the Bingen Forest are:

- Bacharach – in the Rhine valley, some way beyond the northern edge of the forest
- Trechtingshausen – in the Rhine valley, on the northeastern edge
- Bingen – on the eastern edge
- Weiler – on the south-southeastern edge
- Waldalgesheim – on the southeastern edge
- Stromberg – on the southern edge
- Seibersbach – on the southwestern edge, near the transition to the Soonwald
- Rheinböllen – on the western edge
- Daxweiler – on the southwestern edge

== Tourism ==
A section of the E8 European long distance path and the Bingen Forest Nature Trail run through the Bingen Forest, along its main crest. Other sights and geographical destinations are:

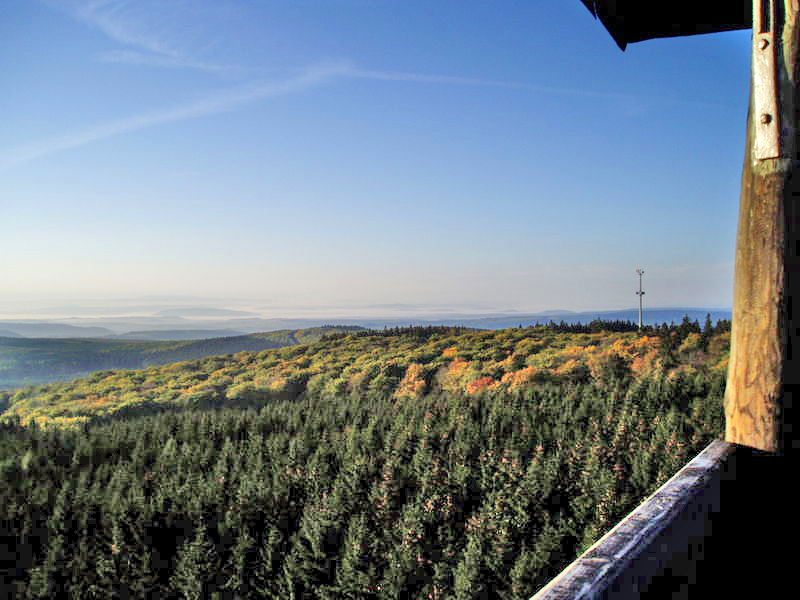
View from the Salzkopf Tower over the Bingen Forest to the south

- Hohneck Castle – above the Rhine valley
- Reichenstein Castle – above the Rhine valley
- Rheinstein Castle – above the Rhine valley
- Sooneck Castle – above the Rhine valley
- Rock formations in the Morgenbach valley and near Bingerbrück incl. a climbing garden with protected tours
- Hunsrück Wildlife Park – somewhat to the northwest of the Bingen Forest
- Salzkopf Tower – a 24 metre high observation tower – on the Salzkopf (628 m)
- Former Waldalgesheim show mine – southeast of the Bingen Forest
- Siebenburgenblick – observation tower northwest of Sooneck Castle with views over part of the Middle Rhine valley and 7 castles
- Villa Rustica – a Roman manor house above the Rhine valley
- Forest inns (Forsthaus Lauschhütte, Gerhardshof, Schweizerhaus, Jägerhaus, Forsthaus Heiligkreuz, Forsthaus Emmerichshütte)
- Lauschhütte Climbing Wood – A high rope garden with ca. 50 climbing elements, which is integrated into the trees. The climbing wood comprises several routes of varying difficulties and heights.
- Steckeschläfer Klamm – a gorge near the Jägerhaus with 66 faces cut into the trees

== Transport ==
The Bingen Forest may be reached, for example, by roads branching off from the A 61 motorway (junctions Rheinböllen and Waldlaubersheim), which lies to the southwest and south, running along the edge of the forest opposite the Soonwald. In addition, Bingen Forest may be accessed via the A 9 which runs in a northwest-southeast direction through the Middle Rhine valley from Koblenz to Bingen.

Railway lines run on either side - for example, along the B 9 - through the Rhine valley (north) and the valley of the Guldenbach (south). The latter is currently closed; however it is to be re-opened in the near future because of the Frankfurt-Hahn Airport which is located southwest of the Bingen Forest and roughly west of Kirchberg between Hahn and Lautzenhausen.

== Literature ==
- Uwe Anhäuser: The Ausoniusstraße von Bingen über den Hunsrück nach Trier. Ein archäologischer Reise- and Wanderführer. Rhein-Mosel-Verlag, Alf/ Mosel 2006, ISBN 3-89801-032-5
