= Kandrich =

Mountain in the Bingen Forest, Germany

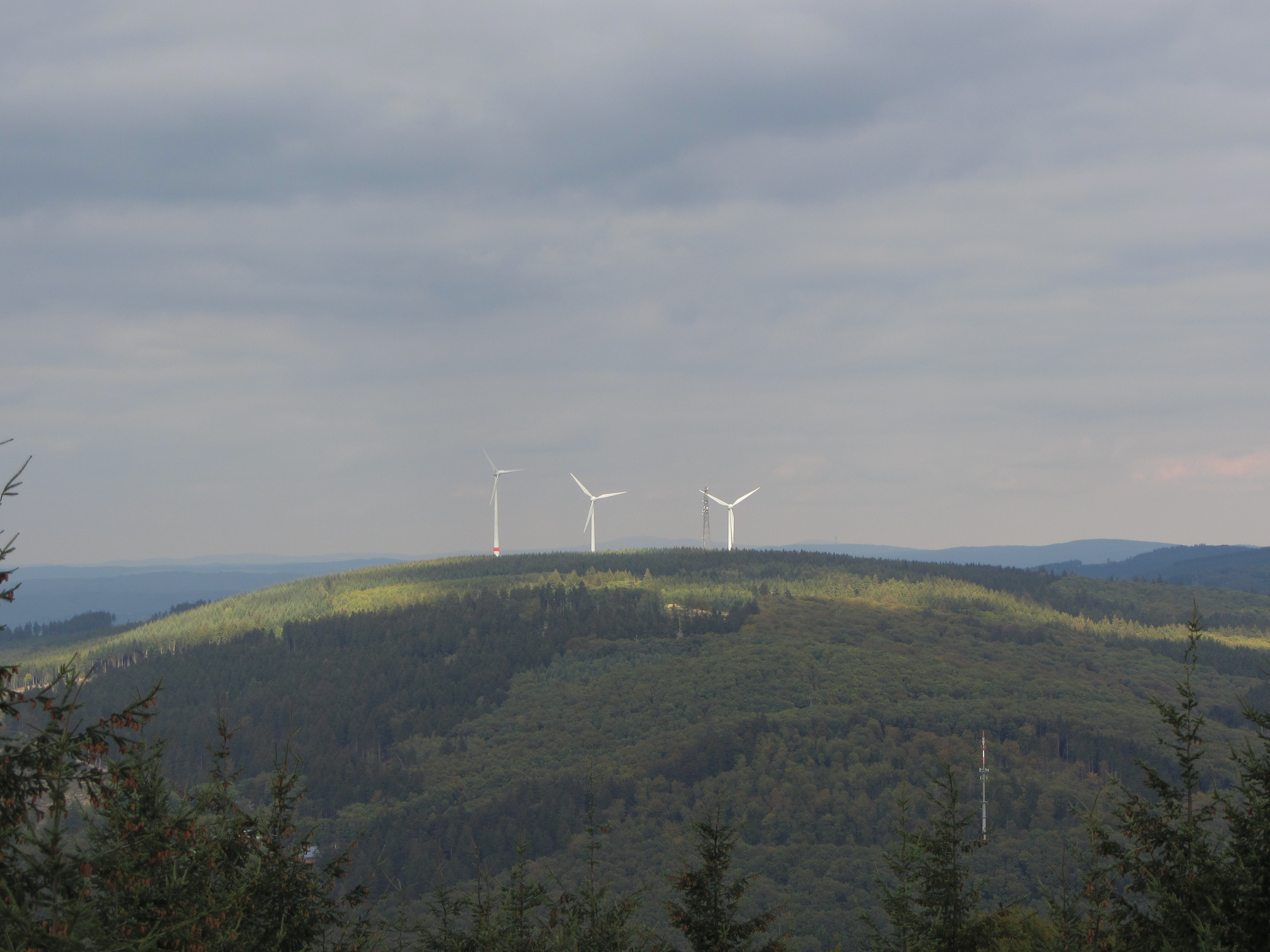
- View from the Hochsteinchen observation tower of the Kandrich, the wind park and transmission mast

Highest point
- Elevation: 638.6 m above sea level (NHN) (2,095 ft)
- Coordinates: 49°59′38″N 7°43′42″E

Geography
- Location within Rhineland-Palatinate
- Location: nahe Daxweiler; Bad Kreuznach Rhineland-Palatinate Germany
- Parent range: Bingen Forest (Hunsrück)

Climbing
- Access: Waldwege

The Kandrich, at 638.6 m above sea level (NHN), is the highest mountain in the Bingen Forest. It is near Daxweiler in the county of Bad Kreuznach in the German state of Rhineland-Palatinate.

== Geography ==
The Kandrich lies in the northern tip of the county of Bad Kreuznach and within the parish of Daxweiler. It is located about 3.5 kilometres north-northwest of this village and 3.7 kilometres north-northeast of Seibersbach. In the neighbouring county of Rhein-Hunsrück-Kreis lies the villages of Dichtelbach, 3 kilometres to the northwest and Rheinböllen, 4.2 kilometres to the west-northwest (as the crow flies). The Nahe tributary of the Guldenbach runs past the mountain to the southwest. The northeastern spur of the mountain is the Ohligsberg (604.1 m) and its southwestern spur is the Hammerberg (583.6 m).

Parts of the protected area, Rheingebiet von Bingen bis Koblenz (CDDA-No. 323852; 1978 established in 1978; 403.28 km²), covers the mountain.

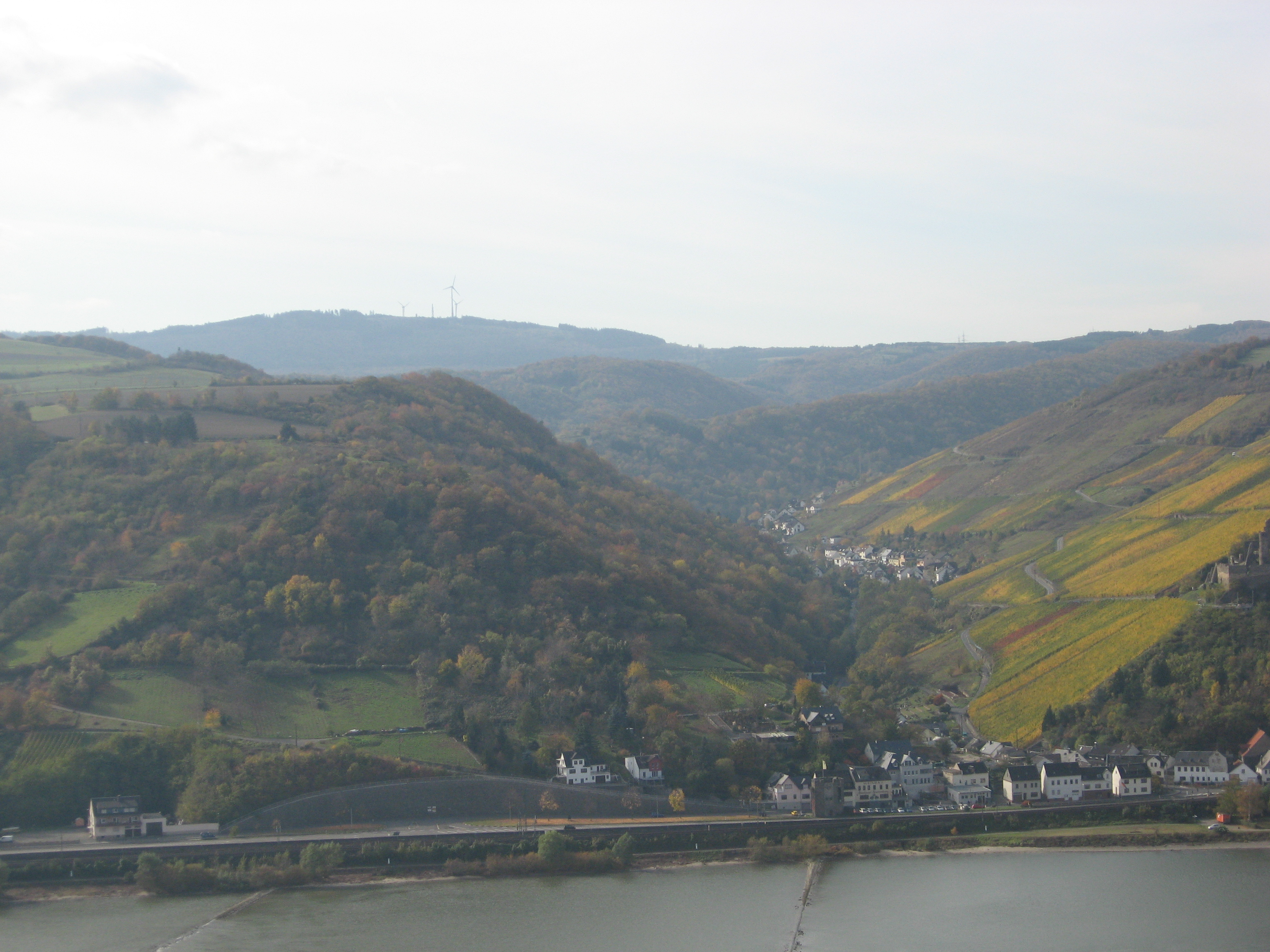
View over the Rhine, Rheindiebach and Oberdiebach to the Kandrich

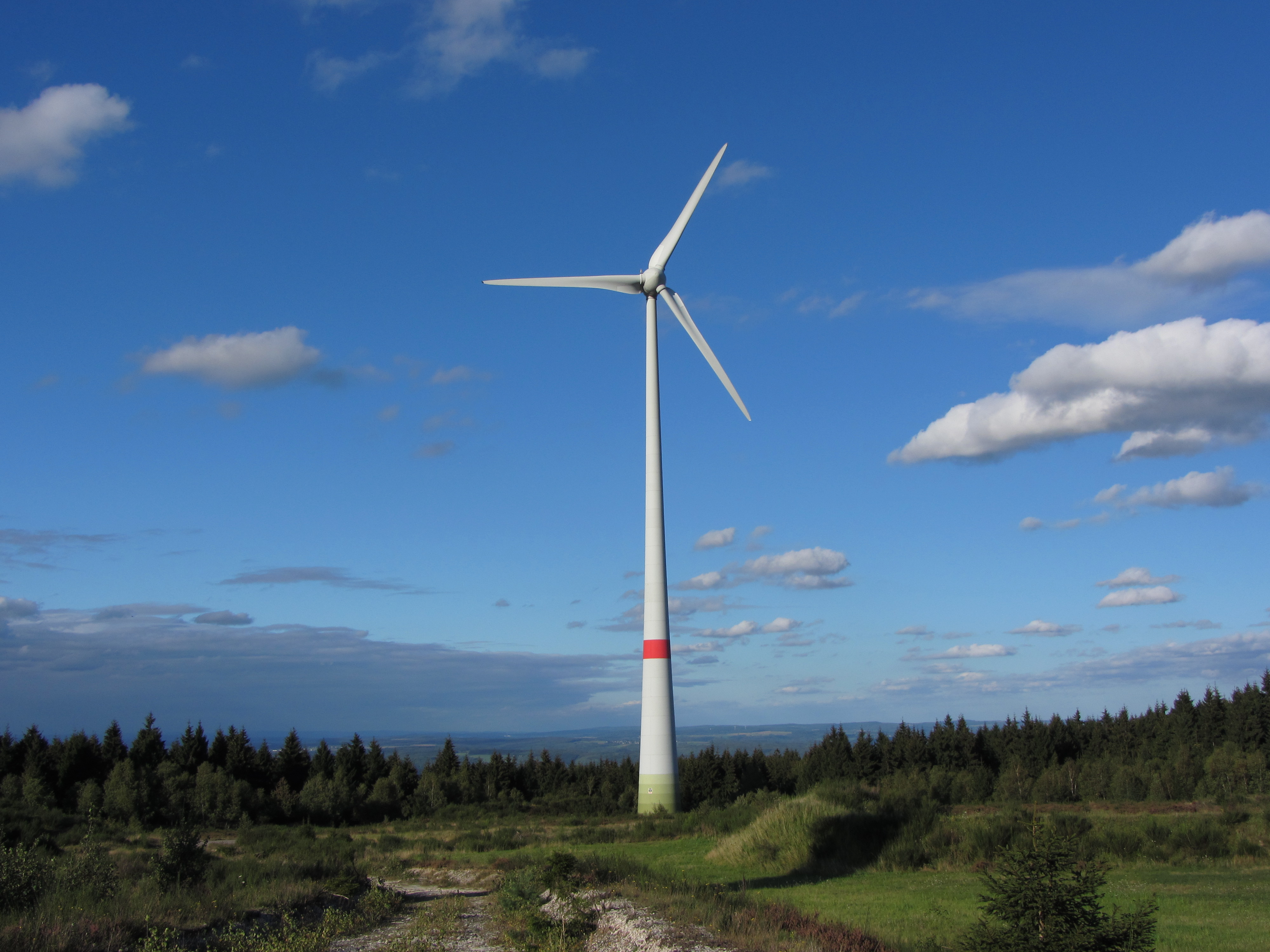
Kandrich plateau and wind power site (Typ E-70); view looking northeast to the Rhine

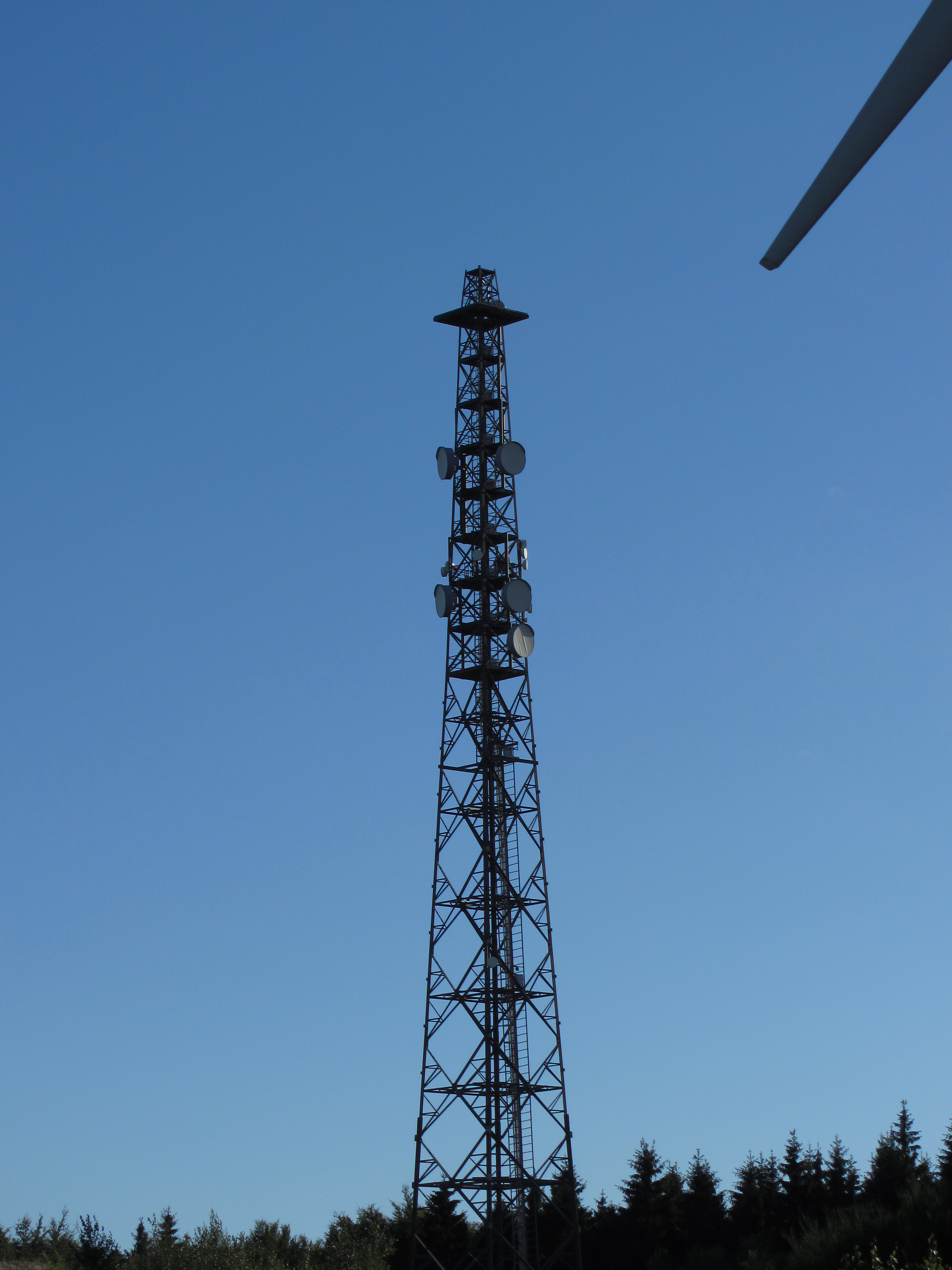
Transmission mast
