= Königstuhl =

Königstuhl or Königsstuhl (King's seat) may refer to:

== Geologic formations ==
- Königstuhl (Gurktal Alps), in the Nock Mountains of the Gurktal Alps of Austria
- Königstuhl (Odenwald), a mountain near Heidelberg in Germany
- Königsstuhl (Rügen), a chalk rock promentary on the island of Rügen in Germany
- Großer Königstuhl, near the Turracher Höhe Pass in the Gurktal Alps of Austria
- Königstuhl, the highest point on the mountain of Donnersberg in Germany

== Other uses ==
- Königsstuhl (horse) (1976–1995), a champion race horse
- Königsstuhl von Rhens, a building along the Rheinburgenweg Trail, Rhineland-Palatinate/Hesse, Germany
- 10949 Königstuhl, an asteroid named for the Odenwald mountains
- Königstuhl 1, a binary star system

== See also ==
- Landessternwarte Heidelberg-Königstuhl, the Heidelberg-Königstuhl State [Astronomical] Observatory
