= Trechtingshausen =

- Municipality
- Coat of arms

- Location of Trechtingshausen within Mainz-Bingen district
- Interactive map of Trechtingshausen
- Location within Germany Location within Rhineland-Palatinate
- Coordinates: 50°0′48″N 7°50′51″E
- Country: Germany
- State: Rhineland-Palatinate
- District: Mainz-Bingen
- Municipal assoc.: Rhein-Nahe

Government
  - Mayor (2019–24): Herbert Palmes (SPD)

Area
  - Total: 7.67 km^{2} (2.96 sq mi)
- Elevation: 97 m (318 ft)

Population (2025-12-31)
  - Total: 968
  - Density: 126/km^{2} (327/sq mi)
- Time zone: UTC+01:00 (CET)
  - Summer (DST): UTC+02:00 (CEST)
- Postal codes: 55413
- Dialling codes: 06721
- Vehicle registration: MZ
- Website: www.trechtingshausen.de

Trechtingshausen (German pronunciation: [tʁɛçtɪŋsˈhaʊzn̩]; formerly also Trechtlingshausen) is an Ortsgemeinde – a municipality belonging to a Verbandsgemeinde, a kind of collective municipality – in the Mainz-Bingen district in Rhineland-Palatinate, Germany.

The winegrowing centre belongs to the Verbandsgemeinde of Rhein-Nahe, whose seat is in Bingen am Rhein, although that town is not within its bounds. Since 2003, Trechtingshausen has been part of the Rhine Gorge UNESCO World Heritage Site.

== Geography ==
=== Location ===
Trechtingshausen lies between Koblenz and Bingen right in the upper Rhine Gorge. It is found on the northeast slope of the Bingen Forest (Binger Wald). Near Trechtingshausen the Morgenbach flows into the Rhine.

== History ==
The Chronicler told of the Castrum Trajani (“Trajan’s Castrum”) in Roman times.

In Frankish times, Trechtingshausen belonged to the lower Nahegau (a county). Row graves from this time have been unearthed by building work. At the time of the municipality's first documentary mention in 1122, its name was given as Drodingishusen, and then in 1135 Drohtenhusen, in 1328 Dreieckshusen and in 1335 Drechlingshusen.

From the 1135 documents comes the information that Trechtingshausen in the “parish of Saint Clement” was under the ownership of Kornelimünster Abbey near Aachen. Because it was so far away, the monastery appointed knights (Vögte) as bailiffs and protectors. They had their seat at Reichenstein Castle. Over time, though, the knights sank into turpitude, becoming nothing more than robbers.

On 6 September 1270, the Cornelimünster Monastery sold the whole parish of Saint Clement to the Cathedral Chapter at Mainz and St. Maria ad Gradus, also at Mainz. The robber knights, though, kept to their nefarious ways until Emperor Rudolph I destroyed Reichenstein Castle in 1282 and had the robber knights put to death near Saint Clement's Chapel (Clemenskapelle).

In 1290, Dietrich von Hohenfels unlawfully sold the rebuilt castle and Trechtingshausen to the mighty Count Palatine Louis II, Duke of Bavaria (“Louis the Strict”). Disagreements between Mainz and the Count Palatine were not worked out until 1344; Trechtingshausen and Reichenstein Castle passed for good to Mainz. Trechtingshausen and Niederheimbach became a collective municipality and were assigned to the Amt of Bingen. Each municipality had a Schultheiß (roughly “reeve”). The Oberschultheiß (roughly “sheriff”) had his seat in Niederheimbach. The Dingtage – the “moots” – were held beneath Sooneck Castle, where also stood the gallows. The Thirty Years' War brought much sorrow and wretchedness upon Trechtingshausen. Thirty-five houses were burnt down. The Plague beset the village for several years.

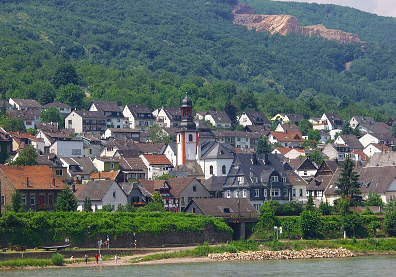
Trechtingshausen

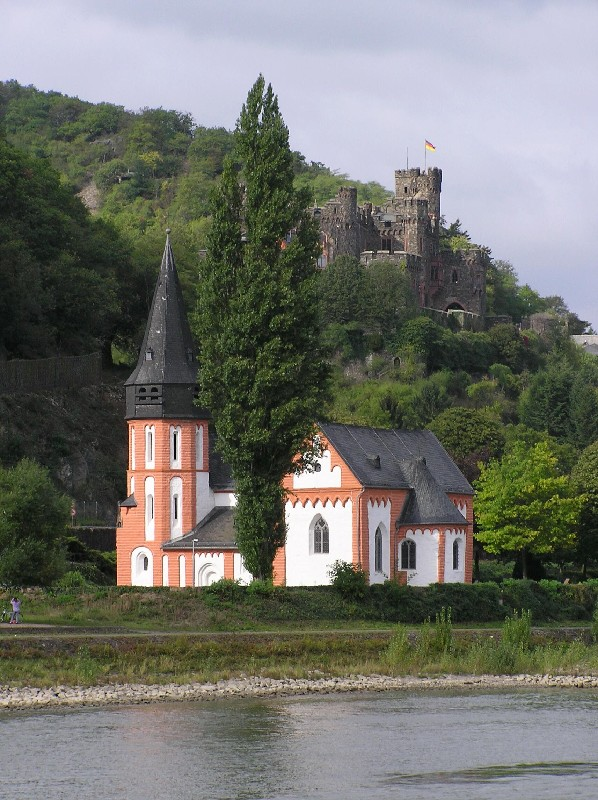
Saint Clement's Chapel and Reichenstein Castle

For about 500 years Trechtingshausen belonged to Mainz and had its Amt seat in Bingen. After the occupation of the Rhine's left bank by French Revolutionary troops, the ecclesiastical princes were stripped of their holdings and with the introduction of French administration, Trechtingshausen was assigned to the mairie of Niederheimbach.

After the War of the Sixth Coalition, Trechtingshausen remained with the mayoralty of Niederheimbach in St. Goar district in the Rhine Province.

In 1938 the village passed to the Amt of Bacharach, on 1 October 1968 to the Verbandsgemeinde of Bacharach and on 8 November 1970 to the Verbandsgemeinde of Rhein-Nahe in the Mainz-Bingen district, to which the municipality has belonged since 9 June 1969.

Source.

== Politics ==
=== Municipal council ===
The council is made up of 17 council members, counting the part-time mayor, with seats apportioned thus:

	SPD	CDU	Total
2004	9	7	16 seats

(as at municipal election held on 13 June 2004)

=== Coat of arms ===
The municipality's arms might be described thus: Per fess in chief per pale gules a wheel spoked of six argent and argent an anchor sable per bend sinister, in base water proper, therein three open boats of the second; [Wheel of Mainz].

== Culture and sightseeing ==
=== Buildings ===
- Above Trechtingshausen is found Reichenstein Castle (Burg Reichenstein).

=== Regular events ===
- Rhein in Flammen on the first Saturday in July: Ship tour along the Middle Rhine from Trechtingshausen to Rüdesheim am Rhein with firework displays at Reichenstein Castle, Burg Rheinstein, Assmannshausen, the Mouse Tower, Ehrenfels Castle ruins, Bingen am Rhein with Klopp Castle and the Brömserburg.
- Feuerwehrfest (“Fire Brigade Festival”) staged by the Trechtingshausen Volunteer Fire Brigade on the last weekend in June (Friday-Sunday).
- Tal Total on the last Sunday in June; for this event, Bundesstraße 9 is closed to all motorized traffic between Bingen and Koblenz.

== Economy and infrastructure ==
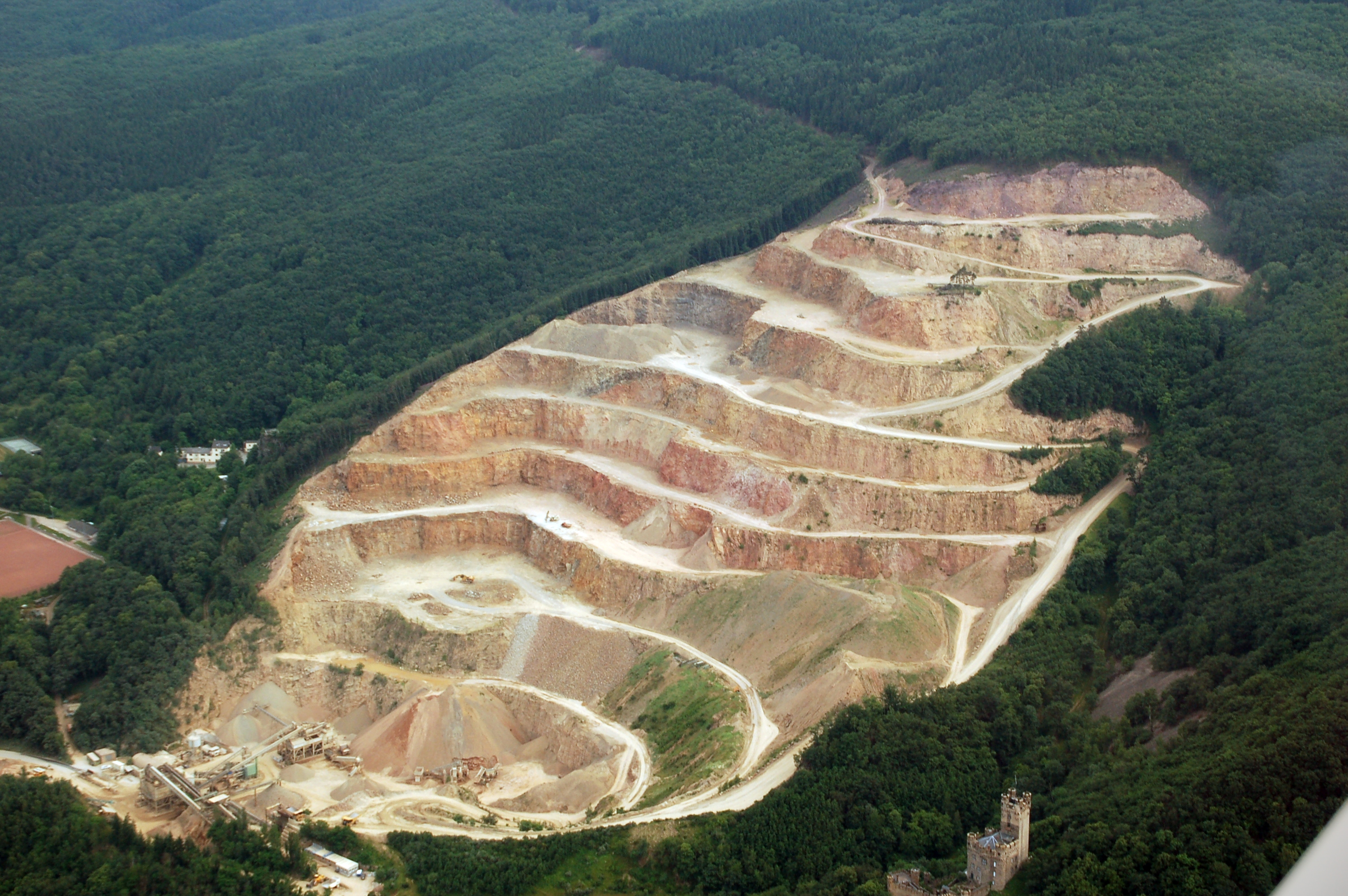
Open-pit mine (greywacke), at right Sooneck Castle

Trechtingshausen is characterized economically by winegrowing and mining.

A business known far beyond Trechtingshausen's limits is the stoneworks, which quarries quartzitic greywacke from a strip mine and processes it. The strip mine's roots go back to the 17th century. Since 1963, the quarry has been owned by the de Beijer family. Its location near the Rhine and the railway line affords it good links to international transport routes. Among other things, the quarry's products are used to maintain and expand coastal protection in the Netherlands.

Moreover, tourism is an important income earner for the municipality.

=== Transport ===
- Right through the municipality runs Bundesstraße 9 linking Mainz to Koblenz.
- The Autobahnen A 60 and A 61 can be reached through the Bingen Mitte interchange about 11 km away.
- Trechtingshausen railway station lies on the Mainz-Koblenz line.
