= Klopp Castle =

Castle in Bingen am Rhein, Germany

Coordinates: 49°57′58.8″N 7°53′47.7″E

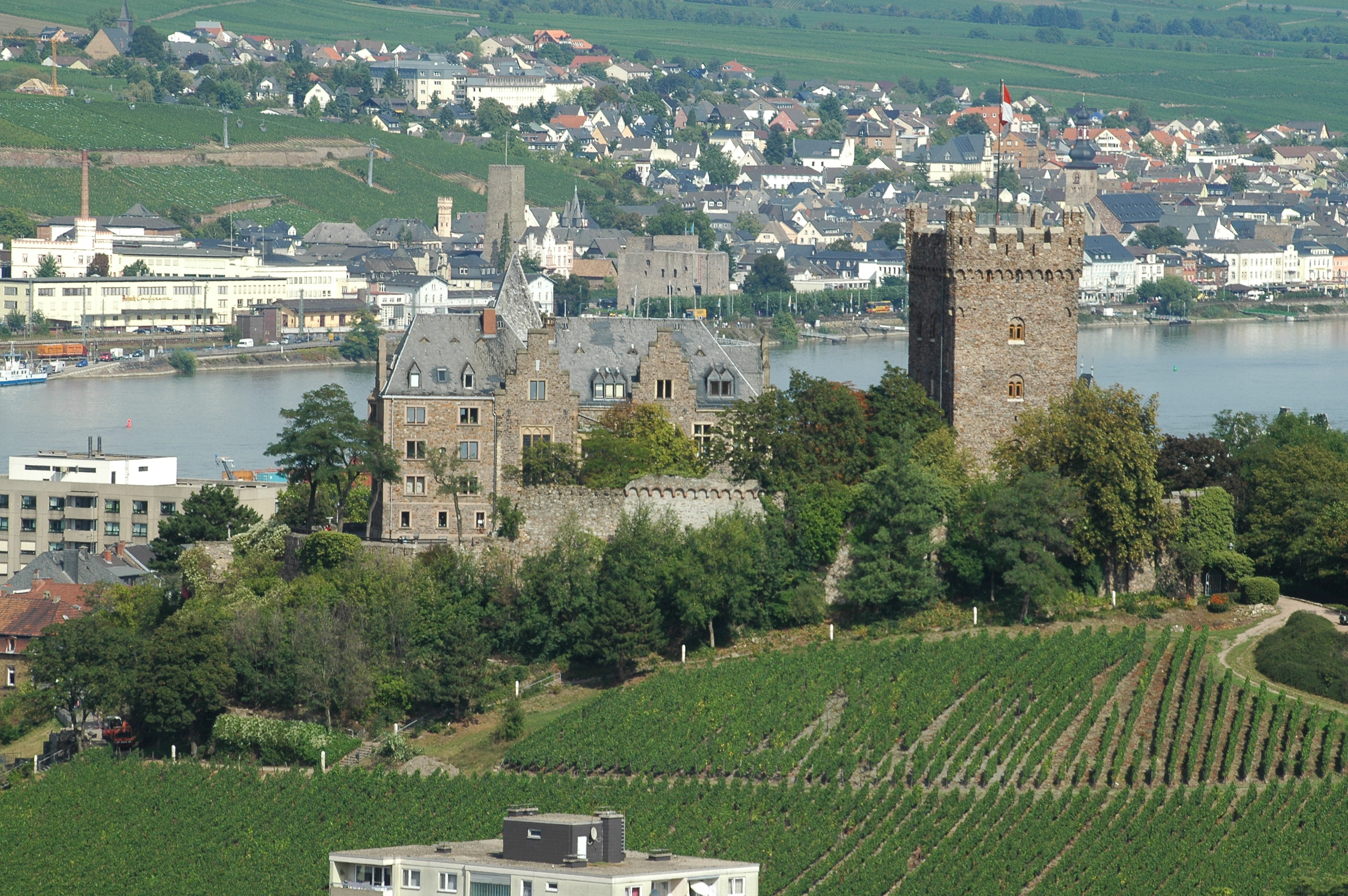
Klopp Castle

Klopp Castle (German: Burg Klopp) is a castle in the town of Bingen am Rhein in the Upper Middle Rhine Valley in Rhineland-Palatinate, Germany. In the nineteenth century, the bergfried (similar to a keep) from the original medieval fortified castle was restored and a new building added which houses the town's administration.

== History ==
The castle stands on a hill above the town with a wide-ranging view, which may have been the site of a Roman fortification built by Nero Claudius Drusus at Bingium around 10 CE. Drusenburg or Drususburg was an early name for the castle. The hill is one of three locations where local legend says that Emperor Henry IV was imprisoned by his son in 1105 or 1106, this being the first surviving mention of a castle there.

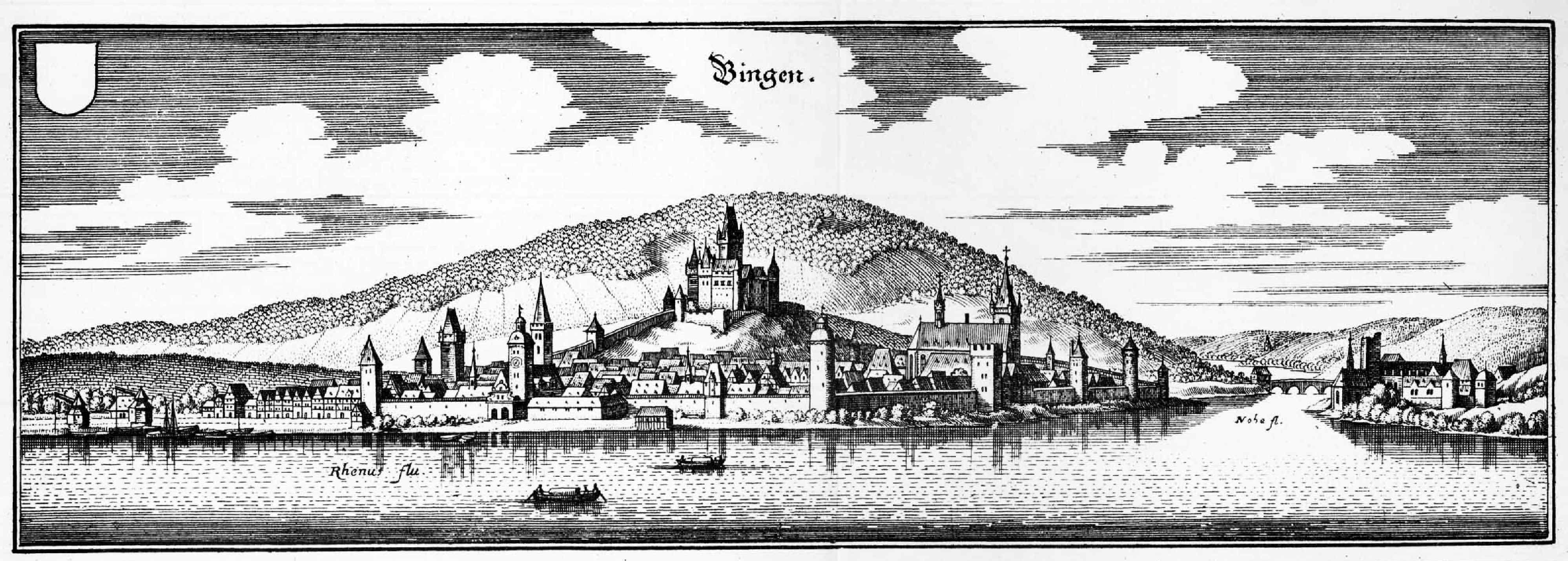
View of Bingen and Klopp Castle by Matthäus Merian, 1646

The last medieval castle on the site was built in the 13th century: possibly around 1281, possibly between 1240, when Kloppberg (Klopp Hill) is mentioned as the residence of a churchman, and 1277, the first mention of Burg Clopp. Together with Ehrenfels Castle on the opposite side of the Rhine and later the Mouse Tower, it enabled the Archbishopric of Mainz to exact tolls on river trade. In 1438 the archbishop sold the town and the castle to the cathedral chapter and the townspeople effectively controlled it. The castle was already decaying in the 16th century and was destroyed in the Thirty Years' War, but was rebuilt in 1653. The French destroyed it again in 1689 in the War of the Palatine Succession, and in the final phase of the War of the Spanish Succession in 1713, the Mainz forces themselves blew up what was left to prevent its use by the enemy. Early 19th-century paintings show ruined walls, one connecting the castle to the town, but the castle itself levelled.

The state of Hesse acquired the ruin in 1815 and sold it to Hermann Faber, a lawyer. It was later owned by a Berliner called Rosenthal, who renovated the well. Both charged tourists to climb the gate tower as a viewing platform; Faber built a stairway up the outside of the walls and a viewing room at the top which he furnished with books of poetry, a comfortable sofa and a fully equipped writing desk, and laid out the grounds as a garden with romantic paths through the grapevines, trees and flowers. He also installed an aeolian harp. The castle was one of the major sights of the Romantic Rhine. J.M.W. Turner sketched a view of it from the River Nahe in 1844. By the end of the 19th century, some 75,000 entries had been made in the visitors' book.

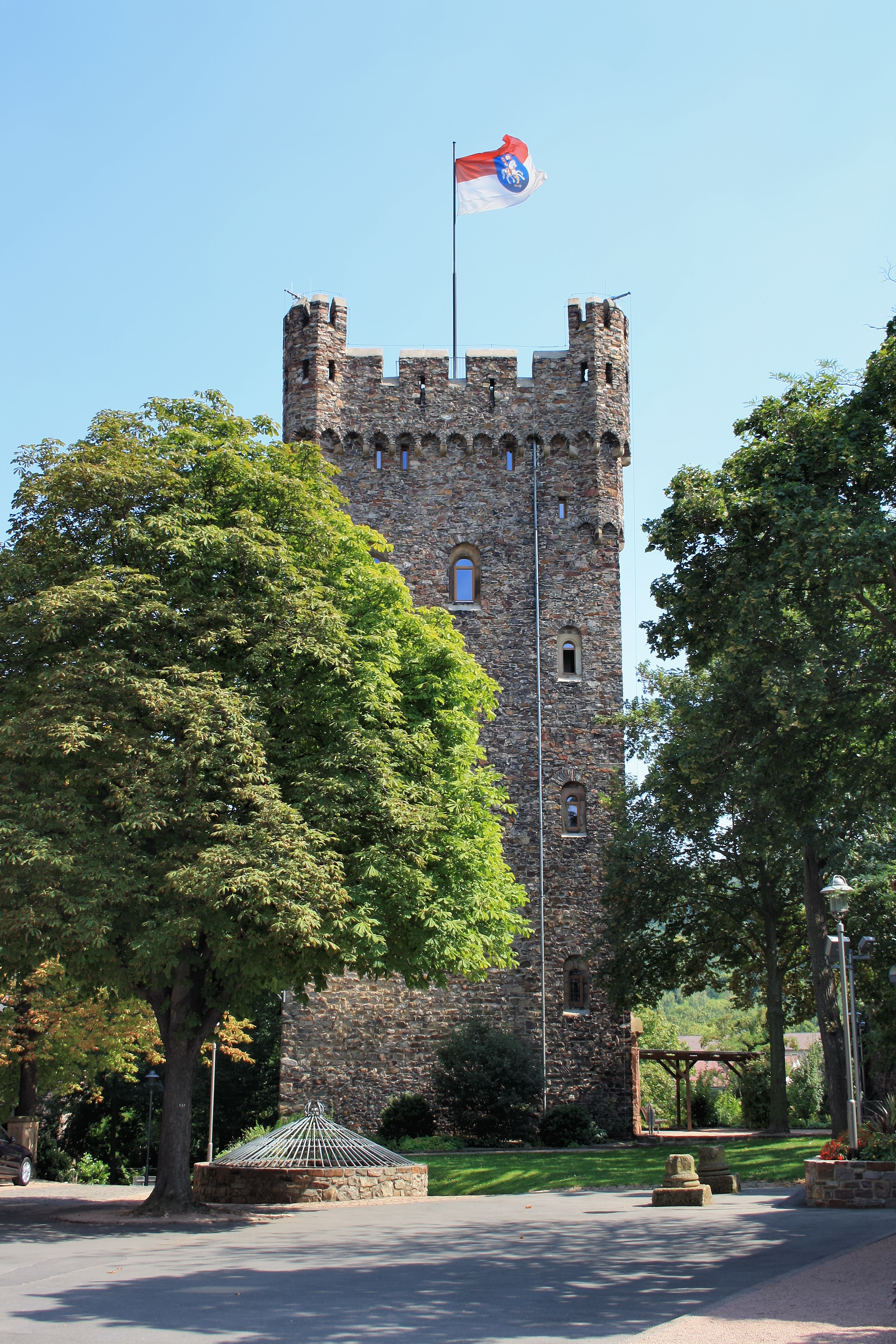
The rebuilt bergfried

In 1853 the gatehouse, the bridge across the moat and the fortifications were rebuilt for Ludwig Maria Cron. The bergfried was rebuilt as a crenellated tower 26 metres high, with four corner turrets. In 1875–79, a new Gothic building was built on the site. The architect for both was the mayor, Eberhard Soherr. The base of the bergfried, the moat and parts of the southern curtain wall and its chemin de ronde are the only remnants of the medieval castle.

== Current use ==
The rebuilt bergfried formerly housed the town's local history museum, which moved in 1998 to a former power station on the waterfront. The larger Gothic building has been the seat of government and mayoral residence since 1897. There is also a gourmet restaurant.

== Events ==
- Rhein in Flammen: On the first Saturday in July, ships travel from Trechtingshausen to Rüdesheim am Rhein to view fireworks at Burg Reichenstein, Burg Rheinstein, Assmannshausen, the Mouse Tower, Ehrenfels Castle, Klopp Castle and the Brömserburg.

== Gallery ==
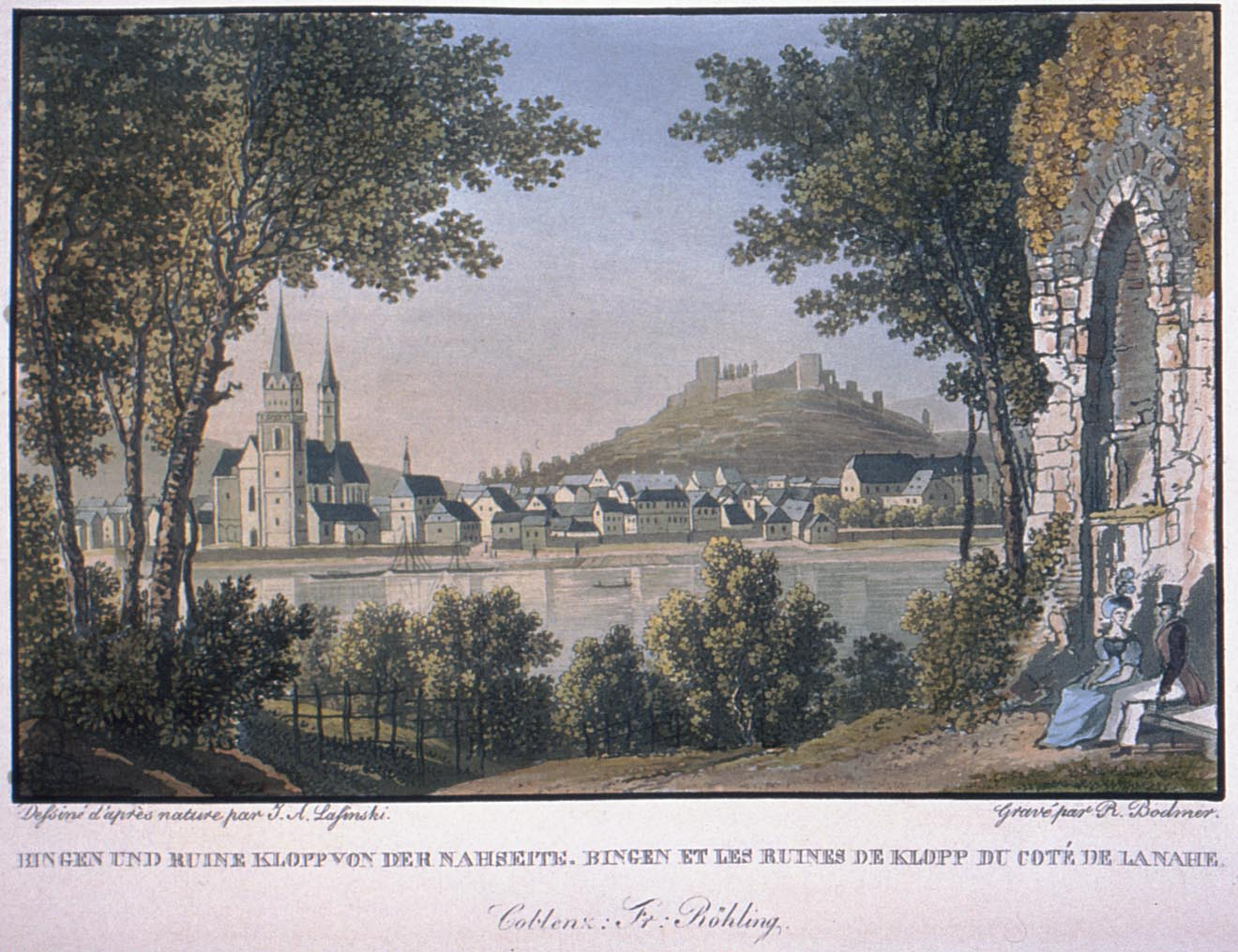
Ruins of Klopp Castle above Bingen, by Rudolf Bodmer, circa 1830

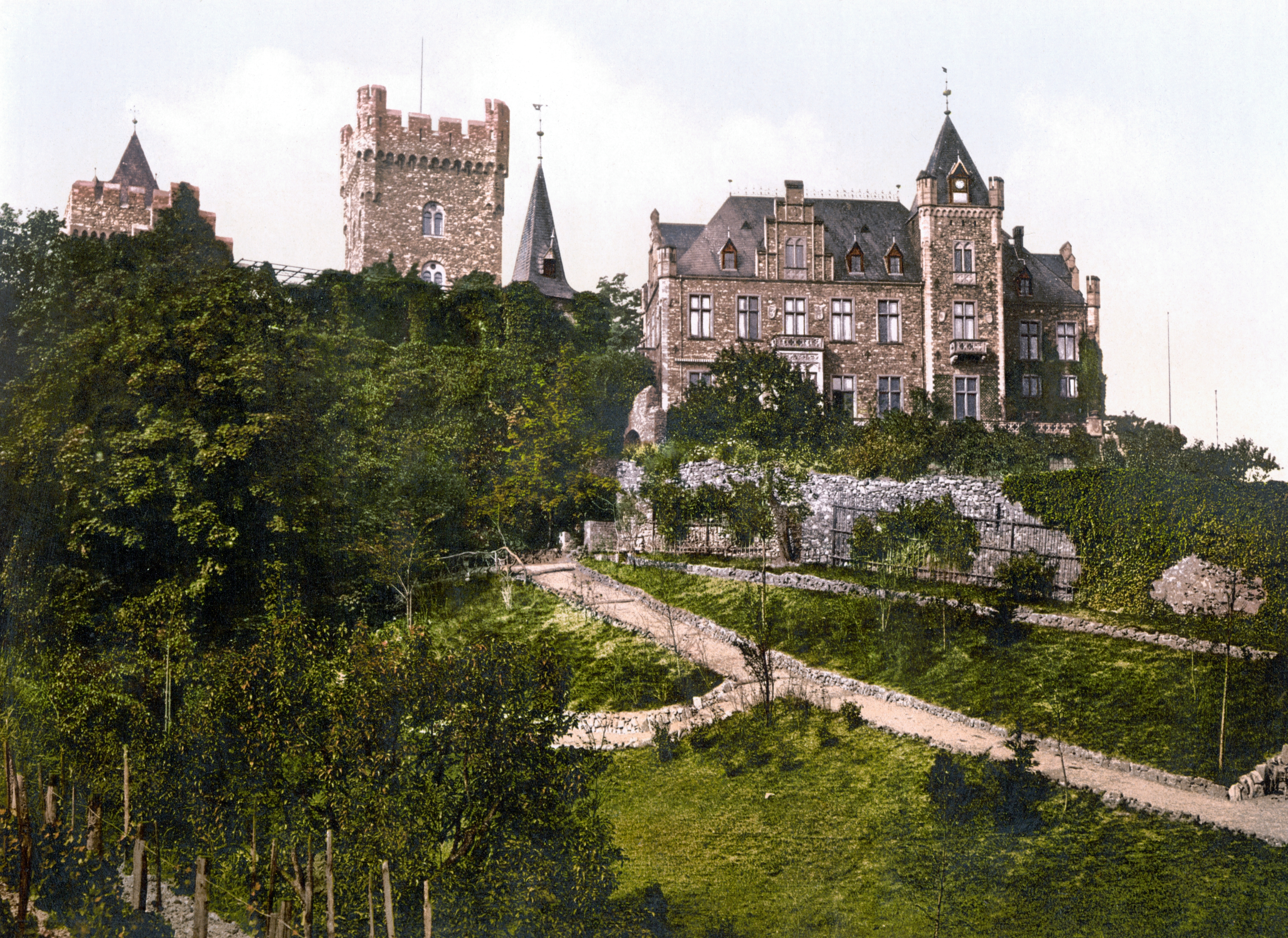
Klopp Castle at the turn of the 20th century

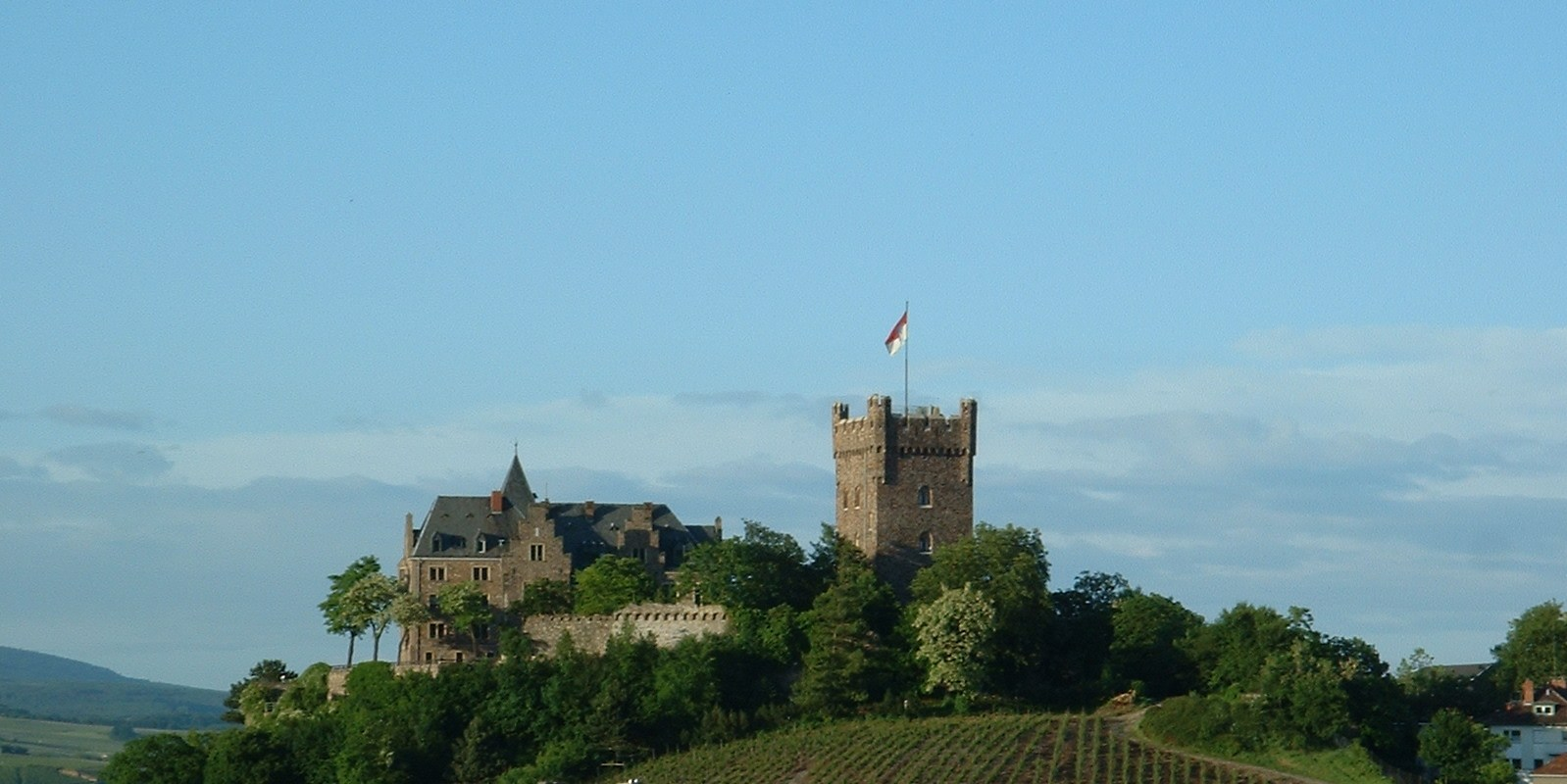
View of the castle from the River Nahe

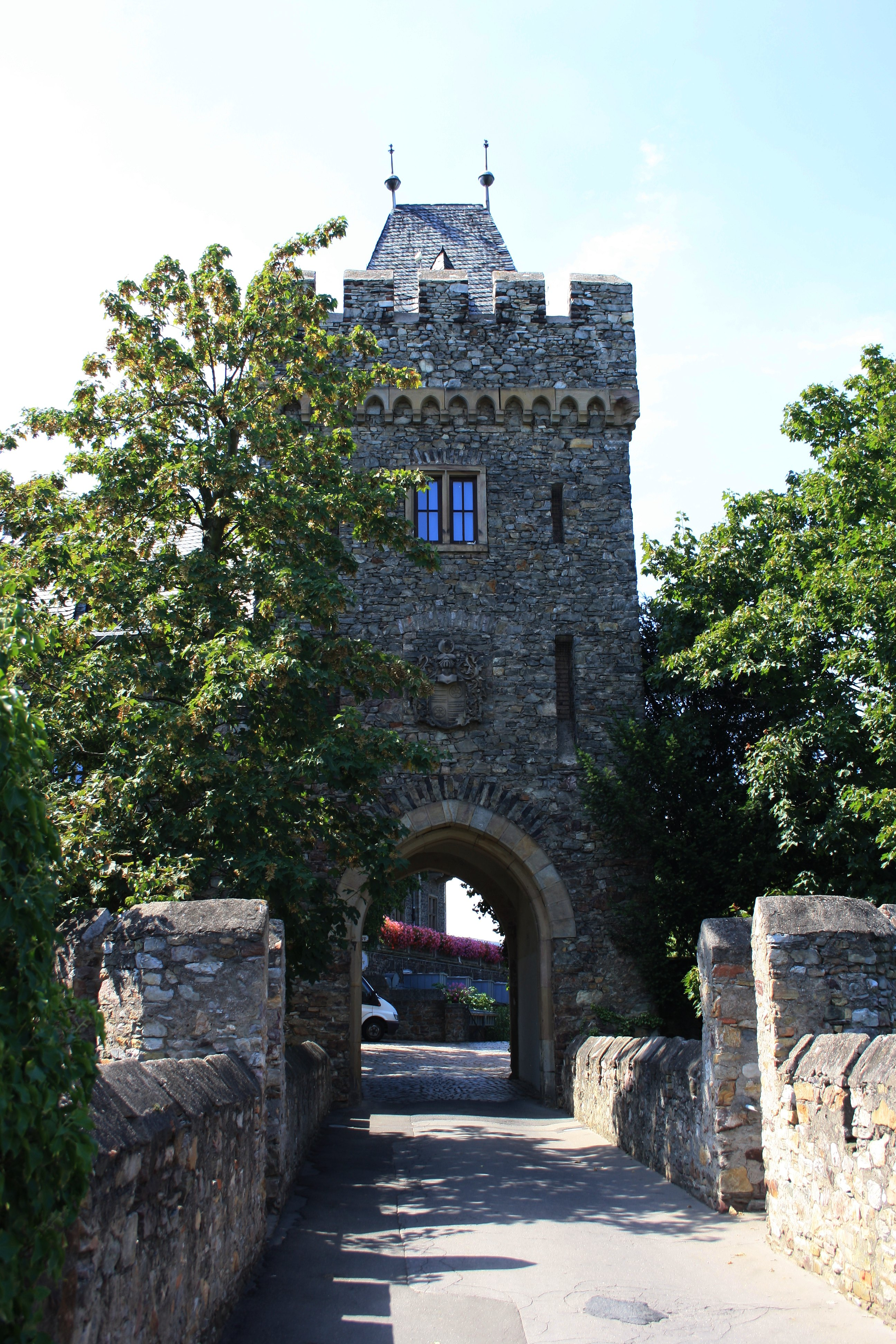
Castle gatehouse
