= Daxweiler =

- Municipality
- Coat of arms

- Location of Daxweiler within Bad Kreuznach district
- Interactive map of Daxweiler
- Location within Germany Location within Rhineland-Palatinate
- Coordinates: 49°57′59″N 7°45′07″E
- Country: Germany
- State: Rhineland-Palatinate
- District: Bad Kreuznach
- Municipal assoc.: Langenlonsheim-Stromberg

Government
  - Mayor (2019–24): Horst Rienecker

Area
  - Total: 16.65 km^{2} (6.43 sq mi)
- Elevation: 365 m (1,198 ft)

Population (2025-12-31)
  - Total: 766
  - Density: 46.0/km^{2} (119/sq mi)
- Time zone: UTC+01:00 (CET)
  - Summer (DST): UTC+02:00 (CEST)
- Postal codes: 55442
- Dialling codes: 06724
- Vehicle registration: KH
- Website: www.daxweiler.de

Daxweiler is an Ortsgemeinde – a municipality belonging to a Verbandsgemeinde, a kind of collective municipality – in the Bad Kreuznach district in Rhineland-Palatinate, Germany. It belongs to the Verbandsgemeinde Langenlonsheim-Stromberg, whose seat is in Langenlonsheim.

== Geography ==
=== Location ===
The municipality of Daxweiler lies in the Soonwald part of the Northern Upper Rhine Plain. Daxweiler's municipal area lies on a small salient of the Bad Kreuznach district, wedged between two neighbouring districts, the Rhein-Hunsrück-Kreis and the Mainz-Bingen district. More than 85% of the municipal area, measuring 16.65 km², is made up of extensive woodlands. Daxweiler can easily be reached through the nearby links to the Autobahn A 61.

=== Land use ===
As at 31 December 2007, land use in Daxweiler broke down as follows:

- Agriculture: 5.8%
- Woodland: 85.4%
- Open water: 0.2%
- Residential and transport: 8.6%
- Other: 0.0%

=== Neighbouring municipalities ===
Clockwise from the north, Daxweiler's neighbours are the municipality of Dichtelbach, the municipality of Weiler bei Bingen, the municipality of Waldalgesheim, the municipality of Warmsroth, the town of Stromberg, the municipality of Seibersbach and the town of Rheinböllen. The first and last of these places lie within the neighbouring Rhein-Hunsrück-Kreis, while the second and third lie within the neighbouring Mainz-Bingen district.

=== Constituent communities ===
Also belonging to Daxweiler are the outlying homesteads of Eichhof, Eichmühle (a chicken farm, despite its name meaning “Oakmill”), Forsthaus Emmerichshütte, Forsthaus Tiefenbach (Forsthaus means "forester’s house"), Soonfried (hunting lodge) and Stromberger Neuhütte.

=== Climate ===
The region's climatic conditions are characterized by the location within the extratropical Westerlies. The region is furthermore also favoured by the Gulf Stream, which flows along Europe’s west coast. This explains why the prevailing local climate is rather milder than would usually be expected at these latitudes. Prevailing throughout most of the Naturpark Soonwald-Nahe is a suboceanic climate marked by rather mild winters and cool summers (yearly average temperature: 7 to 8 °C) as well as a rather high amount of precipitation, namely between 1 000 and 1 100 mm. In winter, the wealth of precipitation in higher parts of the Hunsrück makes winter sports possible. It could be described as a bracing climate whose qualitative recreational worth is heightened by the low levels of contaminants in the air. In the river valleys, the suboceanic climate is overlaid by continental influences. The precipitation is lower than it is in the heights, between 700 and 800 mm, and the temperatures are higher (yearly average: 9 to 10 °C).

== History ==
In 1190, Daxweiler had its first documentary mention in a directory of fiefs kept by the knight Sir Werner II of Bolanden. In 1281, a great landhold hitherto held by a knightly order was donated to Otterberg Abbey, who in turn sold it to Electoral Palatinate in 1441. Electoral Palatinate had already taken Daxweiler from the Archbishop of Mainz in 1375 as a pledge, and then acquired full ownership in 1419. Electoral Palatinate then put the estate into Erbbestand (a uniquely German landhold arrangement in which ownership rights and usage rights are separated; this is forbidden by law in modern Germany), and for three generations it was a pledged holding. A 1419 Weistum (cognate with English wisdom, this was a legal pronouncement issued by men learned in law in the Middle Ages and early modern times) describes the dwellers of the municipality of Daxweiler as “serfs of Ingelheim” (whether the town or the comital family of that name was meant is not clear in the source), a term that hardly applied at any time. The villagers did not feel like slaves, they could go to other villages and even marry someone from elsewhere, and they could even leave the land without having to buy such freedom, as was customary for serfs. Daxweiler belonged then to the Reichsschultheißerei (Imperial Schultheißerei) of Ingelheim. After the Thirty Years' War, the lessees forwent any further use of the landhold because they felt themselves in no position to put the estate buildings and the fields, which had been laid waste, back in order. The lord of the ironworks, Jean Marioth, who built the foundries in Stromberg and later the Rheinböllerhütte (ironworks in Rheinböllen) back up again from their wartime destruction, and whose palace stood in Wald-Erbach, leased the Cameralhof (state financial authority for estate income) in Daxweiler in 1650, holding it until 1733. The next lessee was Peter Assmann, who was from Kirchberg and had a wife from Daxweiler whose maiden name was Piroth. Peter Assmann sought to secure a longer leasehold and bid one thousand Rhenish guilders more than the Lords Sahler of the Stromberger Neuhütte (ironworks). Nevertheless, these lords found themselves able to use their connections in the Electoral Palatinate government to get their bid accepted over Assmann's. In 1773, the Brothers Sahler of the Stromberger Neuhütte sought to secure an hereditary lease on the estate, citing the lack of fodder for their draught animals that would be necessary if the ironworks were to stay in business. In 1802, by which time the German lands on the Rhine’s left bank had been overrun and occupied by French Revolutionary troops, the Brothers Sahler bought the estate at a low price at auction after the French authorities had seized it. In 1912, the Hüttenwerke Sahler – Wandesleben (the Stromberger Neuhütte), together with the estate’s lands, was facing financial hardship and was thus bought up by Kirsch Puricelli from the Rheinböller Hütte. The estate encompassed what are today the Puricelli lands in Daxweiler and the Guldenbach valley, hardly differing in their extent from that time, with the exception of about 13 Morgen (roughly 3.3 ha) of church field in the Guldenbach valley which was exchanged for smaller parcels in the village. The Hütter Weiher (“ironworks pond”) up from the Stromberger Neuhütte was a meadow owned by the Catholic parish of Daxweiler before the Brothers Sahler turned it into a water reservoir for the ironworks sometime before 1800. The parish derived a yearly rental income therefrom. Daxweiler's history is also very tightly bound to the Family Puricelli's, for their entrepreneurial endeavours at the Stromberger Neuhütte and the Rheinböller Hütte have supplied the region with jobs for more than 150 years. On these grounds, the Puricelli family heraldic device appears in the municipality's coat of arms.

== Religion ==
As at 31 August 2013, there are 784 full-time residents in Daxweiler, and of those, 210 are Evangelical (26.786%), 408 are Catholic (52.041%), 1 belongs to the Bad Kreuznach-Koblenz Jewish worship community (0.128%), 8 (1.02%) belong to other religious groups and 157 (20.026%) either have no religion or will not reveal their religious affiliation.

== Politics ==
=== Municipal council ===
The council is made up of 12 council members, who were elected by proportional representation at the municipal election held on 7 June 2009, and the honorary mayor as chairman. No parties vied for seats in the municipal election, but rather three voters’ groups. The municipal election held on 7 June 2009 yielded the following results:

Group	Share (%)	+/–	Seats	+/–
WG Pörsch	22.1	=	3	=
WG Gerlach	40.0	=	5	=
WG Rienecker	37.9	=	4	=

The official figures for the 2004 municipal election rather unhelpfully lumped all voters’ groups’ results together into a single sum. Since they were the only bodies that fielded candidates in Daxweiler, the results simply show an uninformative figure of 100% and a seat count of 12.

=== Mayor ===
Daxweiler's mayor is Horst Rienecker.

=== Coat of arms ===
The municipality's arms might be described thus: Per fess sable a cross countercompony Or and gules and argent three pallets of the third.

Given the Family Puricelli's prominent role in Daxweiler's history over the last 150 years and more, their family heraldic device appears in the municipality's arms. This device can be seen in the lower field in the escutcheon. The other device, to be seen in the upper field, is one formerly borne by the local feudal lords, the Counts of Ingelheim.

== Culture and sightseeing ==
=== Buildings ===
The following are listed buildings or sites in Rhineland-Palatinate’s Directory of Cultural Monuments:

- Nativity of Mary Catholic Parish Church (Pfarrkirche Maria Geburt), Stromberger Straße – three-naved Late Gothic Revival pseudobasilica, 1894/1895, architects Carl Rüdell and Richard Odenthal, Late Gothic quire, 1484, tower essentially Romanesque, 12th/13th century, Late Gothic alterations, Gothic Revival extra floors (see also below)
- Near Binger Straße 8 – cast-iron fountain, marked 1900, Stromberger Neuhütte (ironworks – see below)
- Heimbacher Straße, at the graveyard – tombs, Gothic Revival sandstone Crucifix, late 19th century; two priests’ tombs, 1922 and 1926
- Near Ingelheimer Straße 15 – cast-iron fountain, marked Stromberger Neuhütte 1871
- Ingelheimer Straße 15 – three-sided estate; timber-frame house, plastered, barn, buildings with half-hip roof, about 1800
- Stromberger Straße 14 – Catholic chapel; Gothic Revival clinker brick building, cross roof, marked 1892
- Stromberger Straße 14 – Catholic rectory; Gründerzeit clinker brick building, wall niche figure of Mary, late 19th century
- Stromberger Straße 18 – Baroque timber-frame house, partly solid, earlier half of the 18th century, barn, partly timber-frame, essentially from the 18th or early 19th century
- Border stone, at the municipal limit with Warmsroth – 1781
- Stromberger Neuhütte – former ironworks; Baroque manor house, essentially from the 18th century; Classicist production, storage and administration buildings, quarrystone, between 1830 and 1860; manufacturer's villa, about 1900

==== More about the church ====
The Nativity of Mary Catholic Parish Church (Pfarrkirche Maria Geburt, or sometimes Mariä Geburt) was built in its current form in the years 1894-1896. A church in Daxweiler is, however, attested in documents as early as 1484, and was later partly destroyed by fires and wartime devastation. The church as it stands now is a Gothic Revival building with a rib-vaulted quire. On 19 May 1907, the Kreuznacher Anzeiger published an article about the restorations then taking place (it is worth pointing out that the church was then only about twelve years old):

After new windows from Wilhelm Jansen’s stained-glass workshop in Trier were installed in our church’s quire last autumn, whose whole workmanship was then greatly praised in an article in the Trierische Landeszeitung, the restoration and beautification over the last few weeks have come to completion. First, the quire was skilfully painted throughout by painter J. Bruch, from Trier. The whole work praises the master, and to the viewer they impart great enjoyment, especially the hue, harmonizing so nicely as it does with the new windows. In the weeks leading up to that, a new high altar, which uses a few pieces of the old one, was installed, from the well known workshop of Carl Frank in Trier. The task of giving the altar its required height without hindering the view of the great middle window was best solved by the addition of a retable with turrets. The carved images on the altar’s retable and the antependium – symbols of the Holy Sacrament – bespeak an extraordinary artist’s hand. The whole quire now makes a grand, pleasant impression. The parishioners’ joy over the new decoration of their otherwise already lovely church can be all the greater, as they have their own readiness to make sacrifices in large part to thank as the means for this beautification. … The peculiar technique lends the glass a thoroughly special charm; the hues are of a homey warmth. One can never get enough of looking at the mellow light effect that is precisely measured and strikes one as bright, but not too bright. However often one goes into the church, one may be sure that the stained glass can be reckoned among the loveliest of its kind, that it will keep a lasting artistic worth and that the artist, Master Jansen from Trier, will earn continuing, reverent praise…

The Nativity of Mary Parish Church can be visited by appointment.

=== Clubs ===
The following clubs are active in Daxweiler:

- Freunde der Feuerwehr Daxweiler e.V. — “Friends of the Daxweiler Fire Brigade”
- Gesangverein Liedertafel — singing club
- Jugendförderverein Daxweiler e.V. “Jufö” Daxweiler — youth promotional association
- Kindergartenförderverein Daxweiler — kindergarten promotional association
- Kleintierzuchtverein Daxweiler — small animal breeding club
- Musikverein Daxweiler e.V. — music club
- Schützengilde Daxweiler 1957 — “Shooting Guild”
- Skiclub Daxweiler
- Spiel- und Sportgemeinschaft — sporting union

=== Sport and leisure ===
Daxweiler has a children's playground, a sporting ground with lavatories, a grilling pavilion with a playing field, a bowling alley, a kindergarten and a municipal centre with a hall for up to 300 people and room for up to 70 guests. The hiking trail network in the Bingen Forest has benches for resting and a shelter in a conservation area with a birdwatching platform and a view into the Middle Rhine and across the Rhine to the Frankfurt Rhine Main Region. There is also a ropes course with various courses.

==== Soonwald-Nahe Nature Park ====
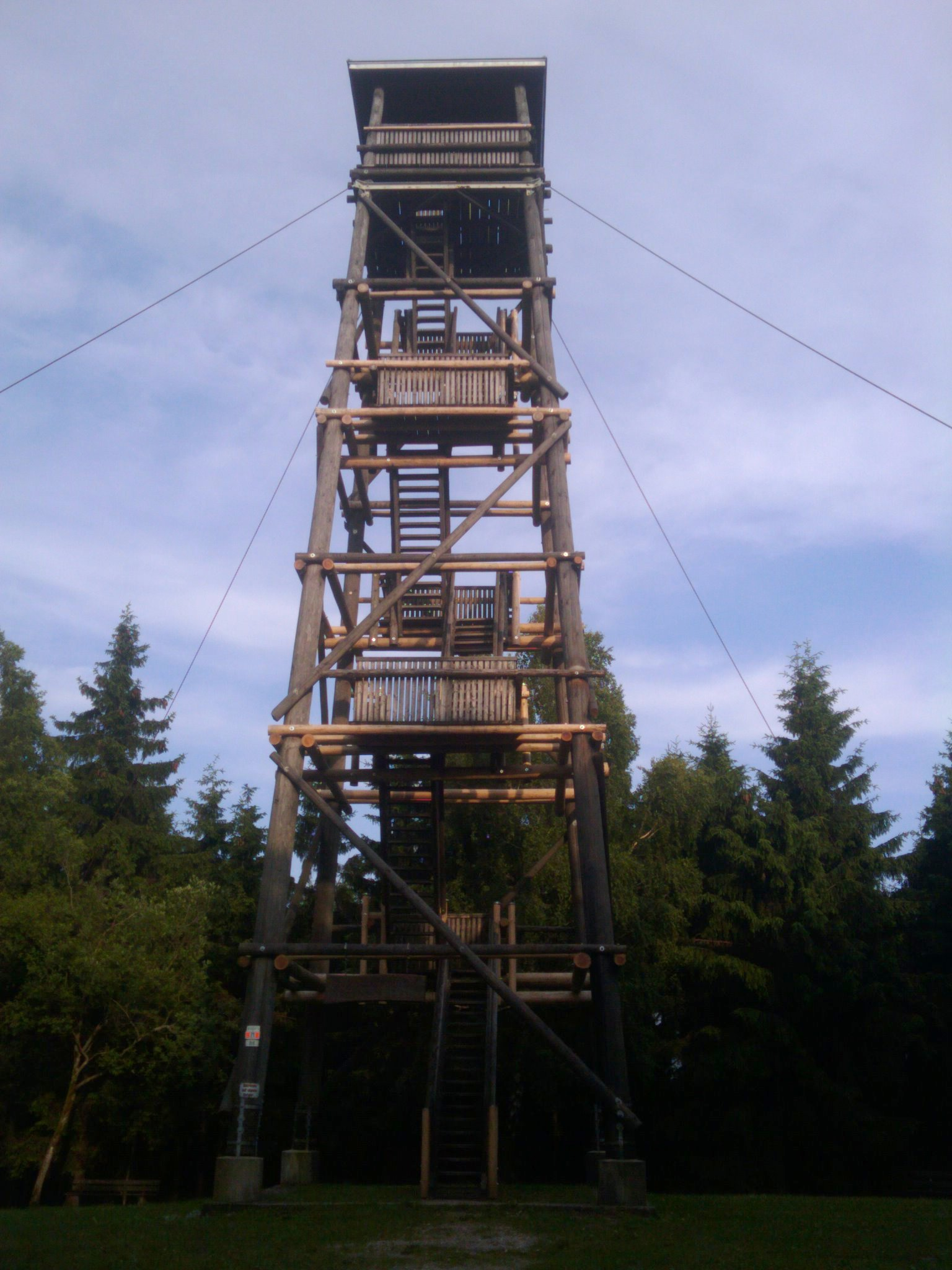
Salzkopfturm

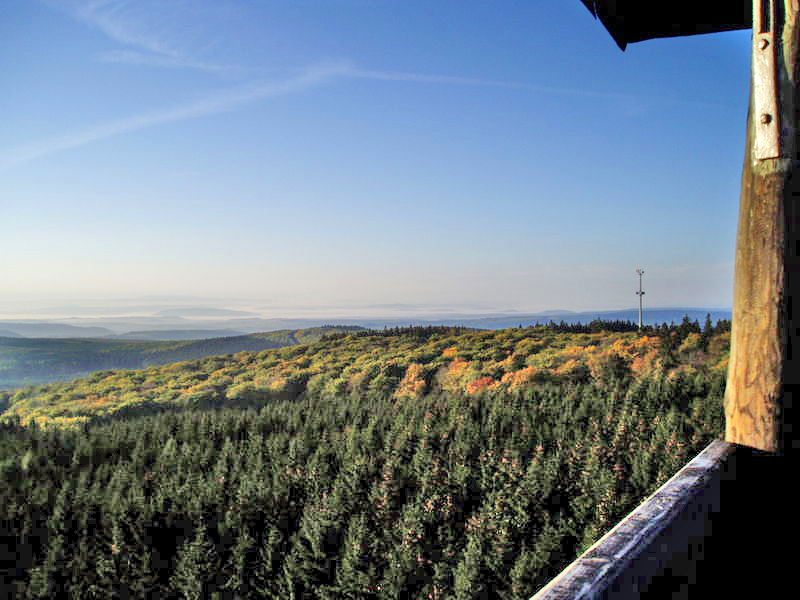
View from the Salzkopfturm to the south

The Naturpark Soonwald-Nahe reaches from the heights of the Hunsrück over the quartzite combs of the Soonwald with its dales deeply carved by brooks to the vineyard slopes in the sunny and dry valley of the Nahe. The landscape and climate combine to give the park a great floral and faunal diversity. Found in the Soonwald-Nahe Nature Park are such varying habitats as blossom-filled woodland glades, mires, slate mine galleries, juniper heaths, meadow orchard areas, and brooks, riverside flats, dry grasslands and fallow vineyards with luxuriant orchid growth. The Salzkopf is the greatest elevation in the Bingen Forest (628 m). As early as 1899 the first wooden tower, mainly for military purposes, was built there by the Mainzer Pionierbataillon. In 1973, this tower was succeeded by a 24 m-tall one, the Salzkopfturm, which had to be renovated in 1997 owing to damage from carpenter ants. It is constructed of waterproofed sprucewood, while the steps are made of oak from the forest itself. It stands just north of Daxweiler. On a clear day, one can enjoy an outstanding view of up to 140 km. Living in the nature park is a broad palette of native animals. Among mammals are the red deer and the wild boar, Mustelidae, fox, badgers and bats as well as the otherwise now rare wildcat. which is widespread in the Hunsrück. The park furthermore harbours many rare bird species, among them 29 on the IUCN Red List. Among reptiles are the grass snake, the smooth snake, the common lizard, the common wall lizard and the sand lizard as well as the blindworm. Amphibians are represented foremost in the dales. Species found in the park include the fire salamander, the alpine newt, the northern crested newt, the palmate newt, the smooth newt, the common midwife toad, the yellow-bellied toad, the common toad and the natterjack toad as well as green frogs and the common frog.

== Economy and infrastructure ==
=== Education ===
Daxweiler has one Catholic kindergarten, the Katholische Kindertagesstätte Maria Geburt (“Nativity of Mary Catholic Daycare Centre”) with a staff of four teachers.

=== Established businesses ===
Daxweiler has at least six inns, one of them with a beer garden. They are Gasthaus Fennel, Haus am Walde, Zur Brunnenstube, Emmerichshütte, Forsthaus Lauschhütte and Raststätte Hunsrück Westseite. There is, however, only one bakery.

=== Transport ===
Daxweiler lies right on the Autobahn A 61, although the nearest interchanges are in Rheinböllen and Stromberg. Running through the middle of the village is Kreisstraße 37. Landesstraße 214 also runs to the village's southwest on its way from Rheinböllen to Stromberg. There is no railway service in either of those towns; however, the old Hunsrückquerbahn (“Cross-Hunsrück Railway”), closed to passenger traffic since the mid 1980s (although there is still goods traffic to Stromberg), runs through both towns, and Daxweiler's outlying centre of Stromberger Neuhütte besides, and there is talk of reactivating this railway to furnish a transport corridor to and from Frankfurt-Hahn Airport. Serving nearby Langenlonsheim is a railway station on the Nahe Valley Railway (Bingen–Saarbrücken).
