= Dichtelbach =

- Municipality
- Coat of arms

- Location of Dichtelbach within Rhein-Hunsrück district
- Interactive map of Dichtelbach
- Location within Germany Location within Rhineland-Palatinate
- Coordinates: 50°0′39″N 7°41′43″E
- Country: Germany
- State: Rhineland-Palatinate
- District: Rhein-Hunsrück
- Municipal assoc.: Simmern-Rheinböllen

Area
  - Total: 5.37 km^{2} (2.07 sq mi)
- Elevation: 403 m (1,322 ft)

Population (2025-12-31)
  - Total: 625
  - Density: 116/km^{2} (301/sq mi)
- Time zone: UTC+01:00 (CET)
  - Summer (DST): UTC+02:00 (CEST)
- Postal codes: 55494
- Dialling codes: 06764
- Vehicle registration: SIM

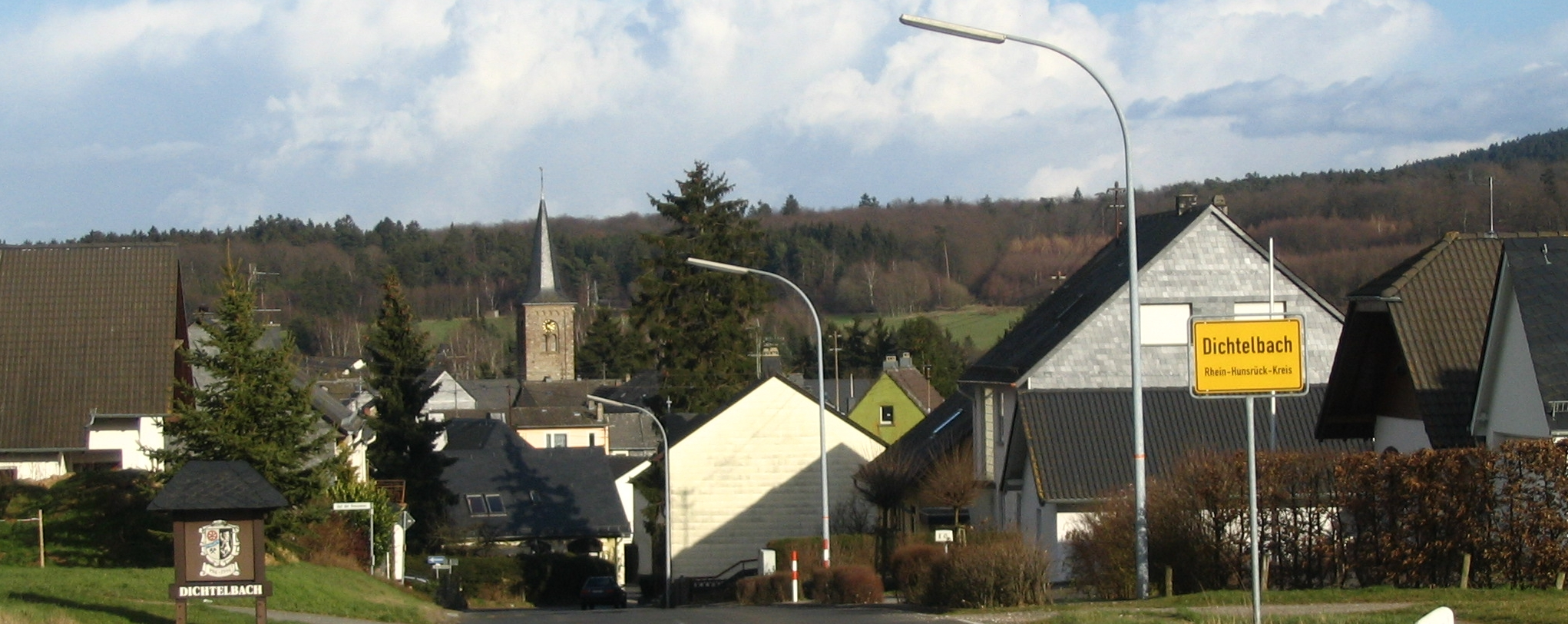
View from the west

Dichtelbach (German pronunciation: [ˈdɪçtl̩bax]) is an Ortsgemeinde – a municipality belonging to a Verbandsgemeinde, a kind of collective municipality – in the Rhein-Hunsrück-Kreis (district) in Rhineland-Palatinate, Germany. It belongs to the Verbandsgemeinde Simmern-Rheinböllen, whose seat is in Simmern.

== Geography ==
=== Location ===
The municipality lies in the eastern Hunsrück between the Autobahn A 61 and the Bingen Forest. The village lies on the old Roman road, the so-called Via Ausonia (or Ausoniusstraße in German), which led from Trier to Bacharach. The municipality's namesake is a brook called the Dichtelbach, which empties into the Guldenbach between Rheinböllen’s main centre and its outlying centre of Rheinböllerhütte. The brook’s name was originally Dadilebach, which meant “Firebrook”, a reference to the many charcoal kilns in the woods along its course.

== History ==
The village's namesake brook, the Dichtelbach, had its first documentary mention on 6 November 996, but it was another 351 years before a documentary mention that clearly implied that a village of that name existed. This document, dated 6 January 1347, dealt with tithes in Rheinböllen; the parish priest and the vicar shared them under this agreement with the former getting two thirds and the latter the rest. Witnessing this deed were several noblemen, among them “Frischo dictus Kunig de Erbach, Frischo, dictus Ritter, et Henne natus Fridemanni de Elren, Henricus dictus Starke et Contzo, dictus Hase de Dehtelbach”, the last one being the core of the documentary proof of the village's existence.

Henceforth, the area around the Dichtelbach was tied to the interests of the Archbishopric of Mainz, and in the time that followed, these interests eventually found their way into the Rhenish Counts Palatine's hands.

A document from 1368 makes clear that the villages of Dichtelbach, Ellern, Erbach and Kleinweidelbach (then known as Weidelbach; now an outlying centre of Rheinböllen) then together formed a Schultheißerei called the altes Gericht (“Old Court”). There is also proof that this Schultheißerei belonged to the Palatine Amt of Simmern under Count Palatine Stephan (1410–1425).

According to the Electorate of the Palatinate’s oldest book of fiefs from 1401, the Counts Palatine had enfeoffed 438 vassals with various holdings, among them several whom they had granted fiefs in Dichtelbach.

Further written sources only crop up from the latter half of the 15th century. Johann I made out to his wife Juliane von Nassau-Saarbrücken a Leibgedinge, a transfer of holdings for her benefit, that included several villages, among them Dichtelbach. The village’s name also crops up in a taxation list from Emperor Maximilian that dealt with the Gemeiner Pfennig, a levy of one Pfennig (or penny) imposed by the 1495 Diet of Worms (not the one commonly connected with Martin Luther). Everybody over the age of 15 had to pay this tax, with a further levy on those with assets of more than 500 Gulden. Maximilian’s list named 74 persons from Dichtelbach who were 15 or older. All together, they had to pay 3 Gulden, 5 Albus (“white pennies”) and 2 Pfennige (“pennies”). A Gulden was worth 24 Albus or 240 Pfennige.

According to the 1599 official description there were 25 hearths, that is, taxable family heads, in Dichtelbach, who all belonged to the Electorate of the Palatinate. Named as Schultheiß was a one Niklas Schiltger, who was supposed to be subordinate to the Schultheiß at Rheinböllen. Various noblemen held fiefs in Dichtelbach.

Beginning in 1794, Dichtelbach lay under French rule. In 1814 it was assigned to the Kingdom of Prussia at the Congress of Vienna. Since 1946, it has been part of the then newly founded state of Rhineland-Palatinate.

During the Cold War, American Patriot missiles were stationed for air defence on the Kandrich, a mountain near Dichtelbach. An old barracks in the woods still bears witness to this time, as do eight horseshoe-shaped protective barriers where today three wind turbines stand. Before the Patriots were there, the Kandrich was home to a radar station, which served to guide the Nike missiles stationed at the Grundlos-Wies, also nearby. Once the Cold War had ended, the military installation on the Kandrich was abandoned. The barracks and the military camp built at the Grundlos-Wies after the Nikes were withdrawn were also given up by 2006.

=== Population development ===
The following table shows Dichtelbach's population figures over the years, each time at 31 December:

Historical population

Year	Pop.	±%
1815	366	—
1835	499	+36.3%
1871	495	−0.8%
1905	474	−4.2%
1939	371	−21.7%

Year	Pop.	±%
1950	436	+17.5%
1961	418	−4.1%
1965	430	+2.9%
1970	436	+1.4%
1975	463	+6.2%

Year	Pop.	±%
1980	478	+3.2%
1985	491	+2.7%
1987	511	+4.1%
1990	499	−2.3%
1995	669	+34.1%

Year	Pop.	±%
2000	680	+1.6%
2005	692	+1.8%
2006	720	+4.0%

Source: Statistisches Landesamt Rheinland-Pfalz

== Politics ==
=== Municipal council ===
The council is made up of 12 council members, who were elected at the municipal election held on 7 June 2009, and the honorary mayor as chairman.

=== Mayor ===
The position of mayor of Dichtelbach is vacant as of 2021. The former mayor, Martin Huhn, is acting mayor.

=== Coat of arms ===
The German blazon reads: Schild gespalten, vorne ein schräglinker blauer Wellenbalken, darunter ein schwarzer Hammer und Schlägel, über dem Wellenbalken das rote Mainzer Rad, hinten in Schwarz ein rotbewehrter und -gezungter goldener Löwe.

The municipality's arms might in English heraldic language be described thus: Per pale Or a wheel spoked of six gules, a bend sinister wavy azure throughout and a hammer and sledge in saltire sable, all three in pale, and sable a lion rampant of the first armed and langued of the second.

The lion refers to the Dukes of Palatinate-Simmern, who once held sway locally. It also refers to the Electors Palatine. The two crossed mining tools refer to ore mining in the Dichtelbach area. The wavy bend sinister refers to the municipality's name (which ends in —bach, which means “brook”). The Wheel of Mainz stands for the Archiepiscopal Foundation of Mainz, the recipient of the Binger Wald (forest) from Otto III, Holy Roman Emperor on 6 November 996. This often cited as Dichtelbach's first documentary mention.

The arms have been borne since 16 March 1981, and were designed by Willi Wagner of Ohlweiler.

== Culture and sightseeing ==
=== Buildings ===
The following are listed buildings or sites in Rhineland-Palatinate’s Directory of Cultural Monuments:

- Evangelical church, Kirchgasse – aisleless church, mid 18th century, west tower 1852
- Near Rheinböllener Straße 16 – hand pump
- Near Rheinböllener Straße 59 – fountain trough, Rheinböllen Ironworks, 19th century
- Rheinböllner Straße – village fountain, Rheinböllen Ironworks, 19th century
