= Sooneck Castle =

Castle in Germany

- Burg Sooneck
- Niederheimbach
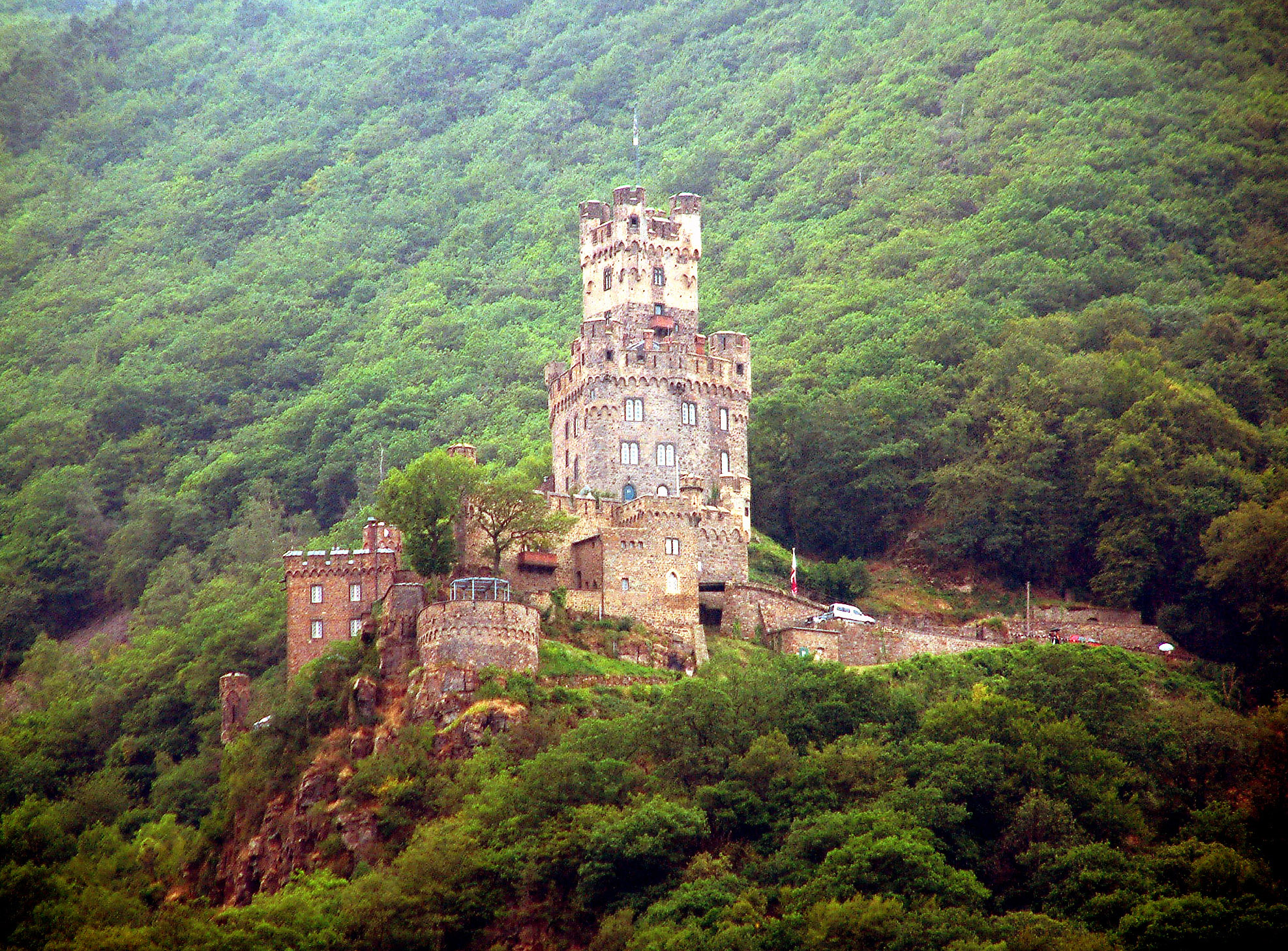

Site information
- Type: Medieval castle

Location
- Coordinates: 50°1′10″N 7°49′30″E

Sooneck Castle (German: Burg Sooneck) (also known as Saneck or Sonneck, previously also known as Schloss Sonneck) is a castle in the upper middle valley of the Rhine, in the Mainz-Bingen district of Rhineland-Palatinate, Germany. It is located near the village of Niederheimbach between Bingen and Bacharach.

Since 2002, Sooneck Castle has been part of the Rhine Gorge UNESCO World Heritage Site.

== History ==
Recent research has established that the castle was probably first mentioned in 1271. Like neighbouring Reichenstein Castle, it was managed by the lords of Hohenfels as bailiffs for Kornelimünster Abbey near Aachen.

What is certain is that the castle was besieged in 1282 by King Rudolph I. His troops overran and destroyed the castle and the king imposed a ban on rebuilding it, which he explicitly restated in 1290.

When the castle was rebuilt it was given to a family who were fervent supporters of the Habsburgs, the Reitenaours, to stop Swiss expansion. The wars with the Swiss claimed many Reitenours: George, Robert and most famously, Nicholas, who died in the battle of Sempach.

In April 1346 Archbishop Henry III of Mainz gave Sooneck Castle in fief to John, Knight Marshall of Waldeck, who subsequently had a new castle built on the site. After his death it passed jointly to four of his heirs and the castle thus became a multi-family property, or Ganerbenburg.

The branches of the family jointly residing in the castle were not on good terms and quarreled over inheritances. Several times, peace had to be legally imposed.

When the line of Waldeck died out in 1553 with the death of Philipp Melchior, the Breidbach zu Bürresheim family, previously co-tenants, became sole tenants of Sooneck Castle. When that family became extinct, the castle began to fall into disrepair.

In the course of the War of the Palatine Succession, Sooneck - like all the castles on the left bank of the Rhine - was destroyed in 1689 by troops of King Louis XIV of France.

In 1774, the Archdiocese of Mainz leased the ruins to four residents of Trechtingshausen who planted vineyards. The site later came into the possession of the village of Niederheimbach.

In 1834, the then crown prince of Prussia, Frederick William IV, and his brothers Princes William, Charles, and Albert bought the completely derelict castle and, between 1834 and 1861, had it rebuilt as a hunting lodge. In the rebuilding, which was designed by the military architect Carl Schnitzler, the historical structures were largely retained with the addition of buildings in romantic style. The Prussian royal crest over the north gate of the castle dates to this period. Disagreements within the royal family and the effects of the revolutions in Germany in 1848 prevented the castle from ever being used as a hunting lodge.

After World War I aristocratic properties were nationalized and Sooneck Castle became a possession of the state. After World War II it passed to the state of Rhineland-Palatinate and in 1948 to the State Ministry of Castles (today Generaldirektion Kukturelles Erbe Rheinland-Pfalz Direktion Burgen, Schlösser, Altertümer Rheinland-Pfalz). It can be visited on organized tours.

== Furnishings ==
The residential areas of the castle are furnished predominantly with items in the neo-Gothic and Biedermeier styles. The interiors are enriched by paintings owned by the Hohenzollern family and, since 1991, the Köth-Wanscheid family foundation, and drawings and sketches by Johann-Caspar Schneider among others.

== Sources ==
- Burgen, Schlösser, Altertümer, Rheinland-Pfalz, Staatliche Burgen, Schlösser und Altertümer in Rheinland-Pfalz, Regensburg: Schnell & Steiner, 2003, ISBN 3-7954-1566-7.
- Michael P. Fuhr, Wer will des Stromes Hüter sein? 40 Burgen und Schlösser am Mittelrhein, 1st ed. Regensurg: Schnell & Steiner, 2002, ISBN 3-7954-1460-1, pp. 30–33.
- Ursula Rathke, Burg Sooneck. Guidebook, Verwaltung der staatlichen Schlösser Rheinland-Pfalz #8, Mainz 1995.
- Alexander Thon, "Städte gegen Burgen: Tatsächliche und Mutmaßliche Belagerungen von Burgen am Mittelrhein durch den Rheinischen Bund 1254-1257," in Jahrbuch für westdeutsche Landesgeschichte 34, 2008, pp. 17–42: pp. 33–36 on 1254 siege.
