= Heimburg in Niederheimbach =

Castle in Niederheimbach, Rhineland-Palatinate, Germany

Heimburg
- Niederheimbach
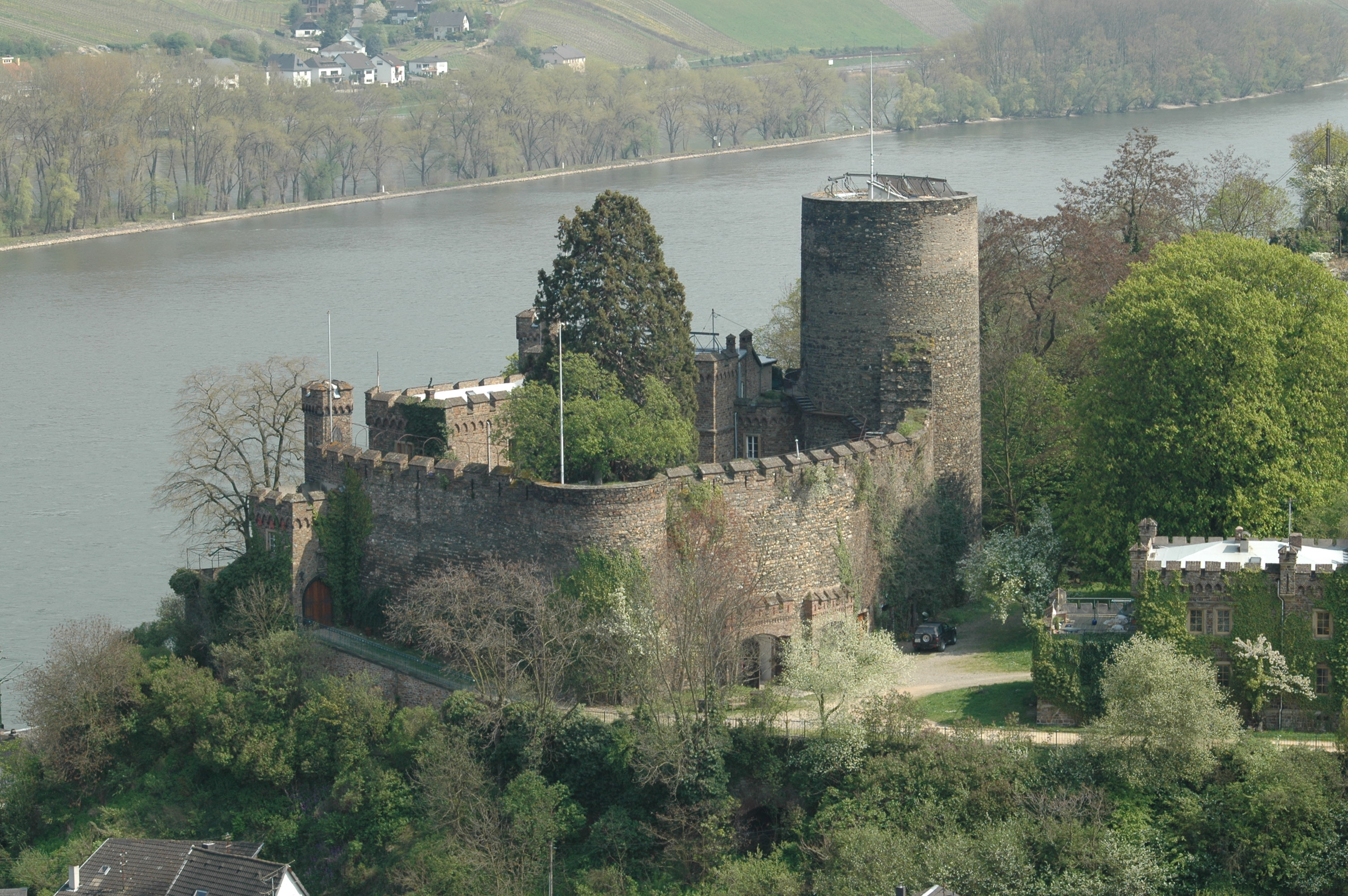

Site information
- Type: Medieval castle

Location
- Coordinates: 50°2′2.1″N 7°48′23.8″E

Site history
- Built: 1294

The Heimburg (also known as Burg Hohneck or Burg Hoheneck) is a castle in the village of Niederheimbach in Rhineland-Palatinate, Germany.

The castle was originally constructed by Gerhard II, the archbishop of Mainz between 1294 and 1305.
