= Rhein in Flammen =

Firework displays by the Rhine in Germany

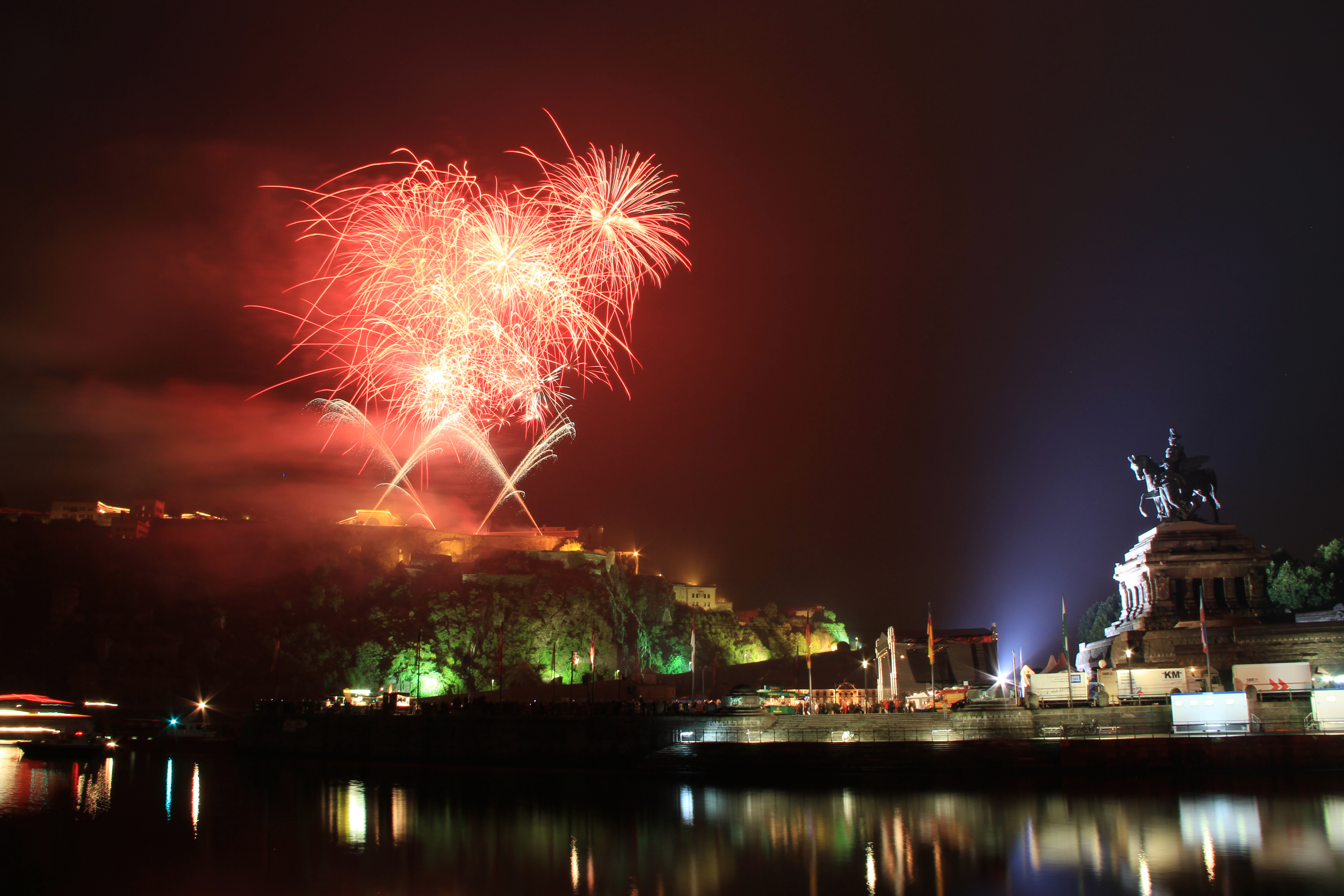
Rhein in Flammen 2011 in Koblenz with Deutsches Eck at the right side

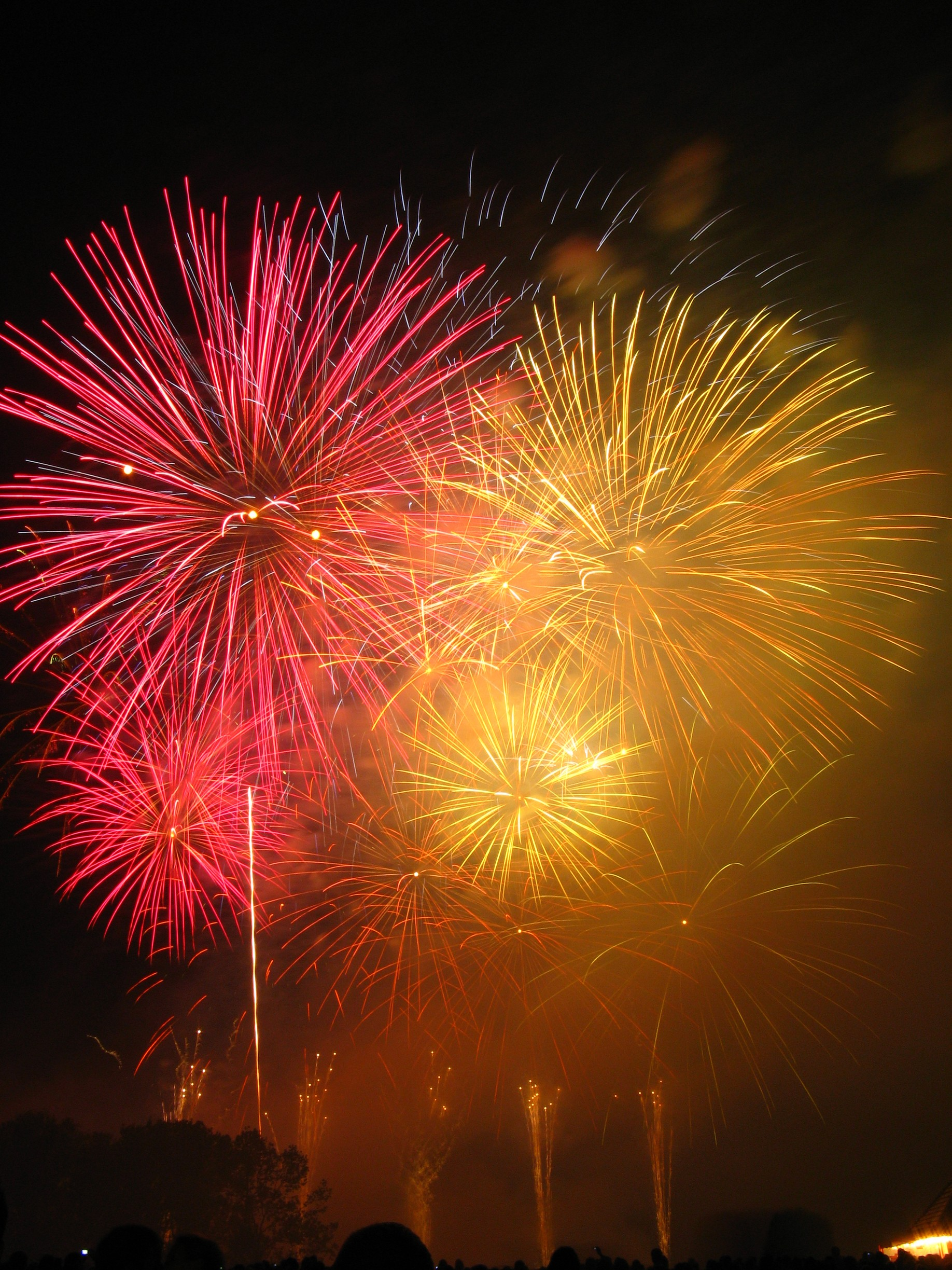
The fireworks in Bonn

Rhein in Flammen (English: "Rhine in Flames") is the name of five different firework displays along the river Rhine in Germany. The displays take place annually from May to September, at various locations along the river. On the five different dates, brightly illuminated ships sail the river in an evening convoy for their passengers to see the full firework display at each location of the river. The firework displays are started when the ships arrive. During the firework displays in St. Goar and St. Goarshausen, the convoy waits statically between the two castles Burg Maus and Burg Rheinfels. On the river banks wine festivals take place that attract hundreds of thousands of visitors every year.

On the first Saturday in May, the event is held in Bonn, in July in the Rüdesheim-Bingen area. The biggest "Rhein in Flammen" event takes place in Koblenz on the second Saturday in August. In early September, an event is held at Oberwesel. In mid-September, fireworks are in the middle of the Rhine between Sankt Goar and Sankt Goarshausen.
