= Reichenstein Castle (Trechtingshausen) =

- Burg Reichenstein
- Trechtingshausen in Germany
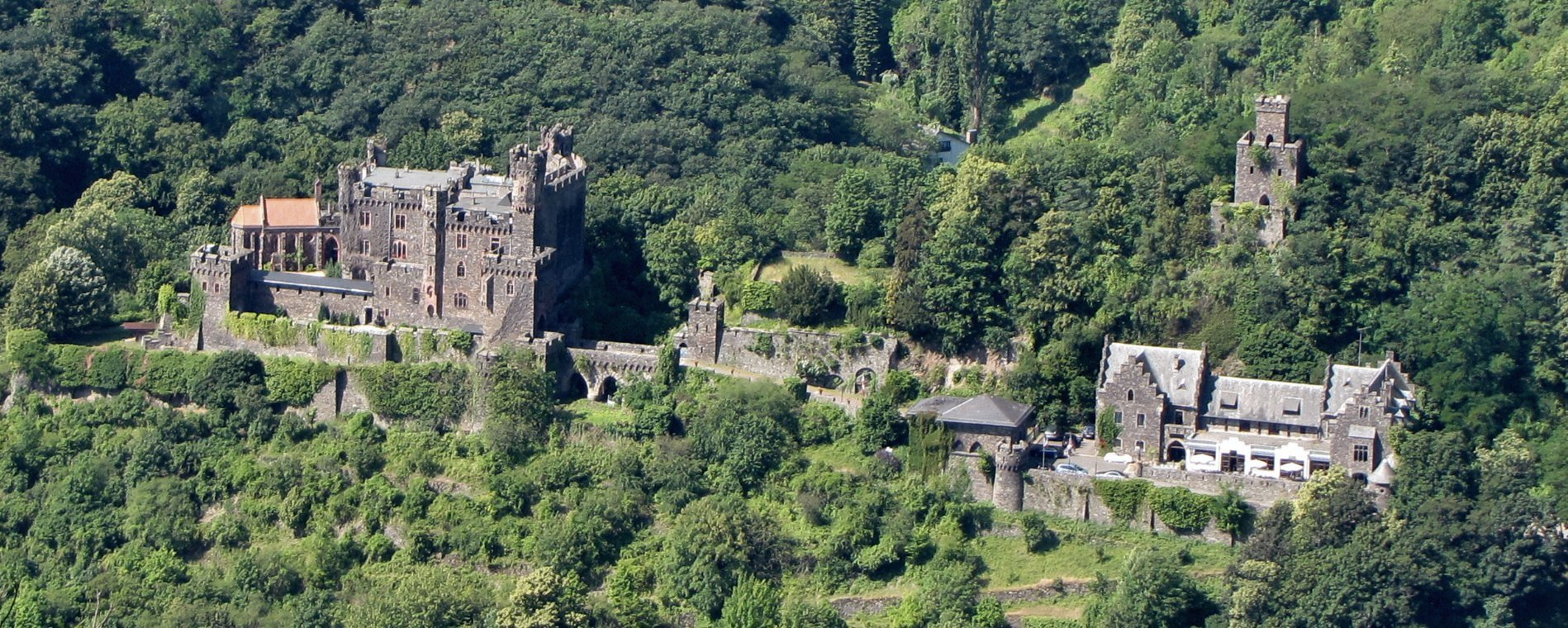

Site information
- Type: Medieval castle

Location
- Coordinates: 50°0′18.5″N 7°51′12.6″E

Site history
- Built: 1100

Reichenstein Castle (German: Burg Reichenstein), also known as Falkenburg, is a castle in the UNESCO World Heritage Site of the Upper Middle Rhine Valley. It stands on a mountain spur on the eastern slope of the Bingen Forest, above the Rhineland-Palatinate municipality of Trechtingshausen in the Mainz-Bingen district in Germany.

== Sources and external links ==
- http://www.caltim.com/reichenstein/#The%20History%20of%20Reichenstein
- http://www.burg-reichenstein.com
- https://castlesandfamilies.com/germany/burg-reichenstein-rhine-valley-lambert-lensing-wolff
- http://www.regionalgeschichte.net/mittelrhein/trechtingshausen/kulturdenkmaeler/burg-reichenstein.html
- Hedrich, Michael (21 May 2018). "Märchenhafte Ausflüge Entdecken Sie diese 19 Burgen und Schlösser an Rhein und Mosel". Kölner Stadt-Anzeiger (in German).
