= Simmern (Verbandsgemeinde) =

Municipality in Rhineland-Palatinate, Germany

Coordinates: 49.983°N 7.517°E

Simmern is a former Verbandsgemeinde ("collective municipality") in the Rhein-Hunsrück district, in Rhineland-Palatinate, Germany. Its seat was in Simmern. On 1 January 2020, it was merged into the new Verbandsgemeinde Simmern-Rheinböllen.

== Municipalities ==
The Verbandsgemeinde Simmern consisted of the following Ortsgemeinden ("local municipalities"):

1. Altweidelbach
2. Belgweiler
3. Bergenhausen
4. Biebern
5. Bubach
6. Budenbach
7. Fronhofen
8. Holzbach
9. Horn
10. Keidelheim
11. Klosterkumbd
12. Külz
13. Kümbdchen
14. Laubach
15. Mengerschied
16. Mutterschied
17. Nannhausen
18. Neuerkirch
19. Niederkumbd
20. Ohlweiler
21. Oppertshausen
22. Pleizenhausen
23. Ravengiersburg
24. Rayerschied
25. Reich
26. Riegenroth
27. Sargenroth
28. Schönborn
29. Simmern
30. Tiefenbach
31. Wahlbach
32. Wüschheim
