= Rheinböllen (Verbandsgemeinde) =

Municipality in Rhineland-Palatinate, Germany

Coordinates: 50.000°N 7.667°E

Rheinböllen is a former Verbandsgemeinde ("collective municipality") in the Rhein-Hunsrück district, in Rhineland-Palatinate, Germany. Its seat was in Rheinböllen. On 1 January 2020, it was merged into the new Verbandsgemeinde Simmern-Rheinböllen.

The Verbandsgemeinde Rheinböllen consisted of the following Ortsgemeinden ("local municipalities"):

1. Argenthal
2. Benzweiler
3. Dichtelbach
4. Ellern
5. Erbach
6. Kisselbach
7. Liebshausen
8. Mörschbach
9. Rheinböllen
10. Riesweiler
11. Schnorbach
12. Steinbach
