= Simmern-Rheinböllen =

Verbandsgemeinde in Rhineland-Palatinate, Germany

- Verbandsgemeinde
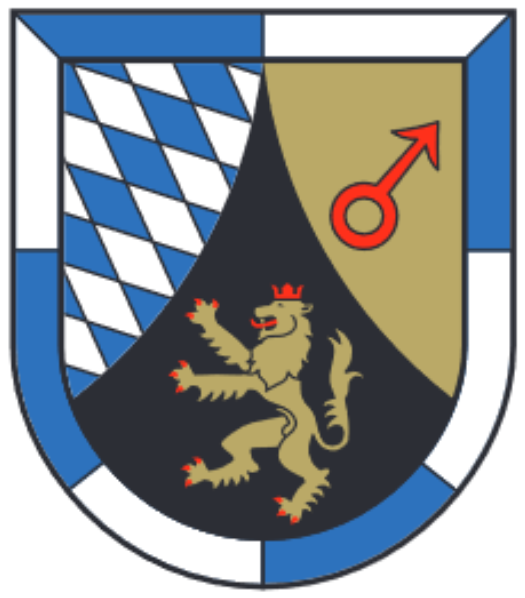
- Coat of arms

- Location of Simmern-Rheinböllen within Rhein-Hunsrück-Kreis district
- Interactive map of Simmern-Rheinböllen
- Location within Germany Location within Rhineland-Palatinate
- Coordinates: 49°59′N 7°31′E
- Country: Germany
- State: Rhineland-Palatinate
- District: Rhein-Hunsrück-Kreis
- Seat: Simmern
- Subdivisions: 44 municipalities

Area
  - Total: 274.17 km^{2} (105.86 sq mi)

Population (2025-12-31)
  - Total: 29,804
  - Density: 108.71/km^{2} (281.55/sq mi)
- Time zone: UTC+01:00 (CET)
  - Summer (DST): UTC+02:00 (CEST)
- Website: www.sim-rhb.de

Simmern-Rheinböllen is a Verbandsgemeinde ("collective municipality") in the Rhein-Hunsrück-Kreis, Rhineland-Palatinate, Germany. The seat of the Verbandsgemeinde is in Simmern. It was formed on 1 January 2020 by the merger of the former Verbandsgemeinden Simmern and Rheinböllen.

The Verbandsgemeinde Simmern-Rheinböllen consists of the following Ortsgemeinden ("local municipalities"):

1. Altweidelbach
2. Argenthal
3. Belgweiler
4. Benzweiler
5. Bergenhausen
6. Biebern
7. Bubach
8. Budenbach
9. Dichtelbach
10. Ellern
11. Erbach
12. Fronhofen
13. Holzbach
14. Horn
15. Keidelheim
16. Kisselbach
17. Klosterkumbd
18. Külz
19. Kümbdchen
20. Laubach
21. Liebshausen
22. Mengerschied
23. Mörschbach
24. Mutterschied
25. Nannhausen
26. Neuerkirch
27. Niederkumbd
28. Ohlweiler
29. Oppertshausen
30. Pleizenhausen
31. Ravengiersburg
32. Rayerschied
33. Reich
34. Rheinböllen
35. Riegenroth
36. Riesweiler
37. Sargenroth
38. Schnorbach
39. Schönborn
40. Simmern
41. Steinbach
42. Tiefenbach
43. Wahlbach
44. Wüschheim
