= Holzbach =

- Municipality
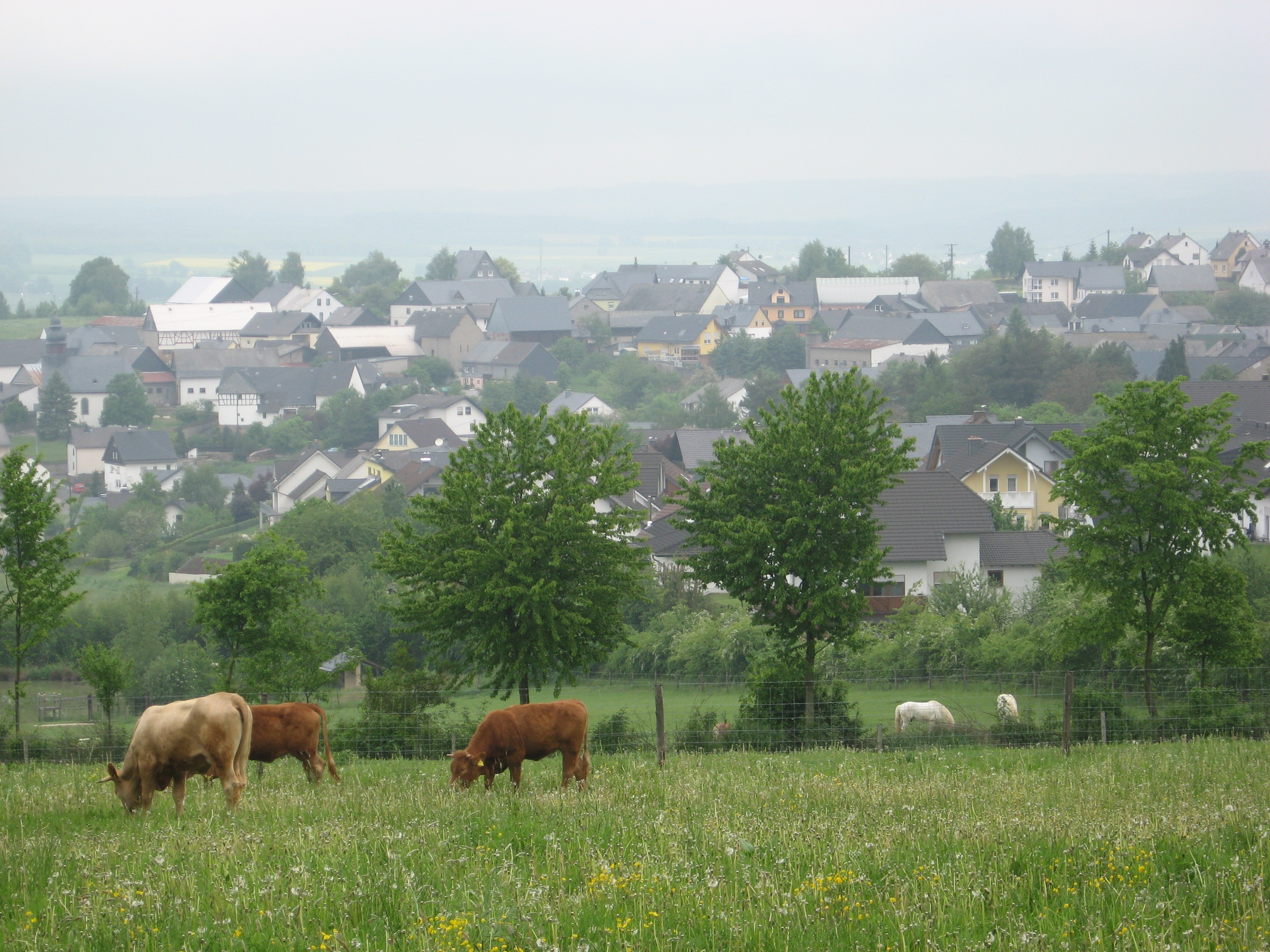

- Coat of arms

- Location of Holzbach within Rhein-Hunsrück-Kreis district
- Interactive map of Holzbach
- Location within Germany Location within Rhineland-Palatinate
- Coordinates: 49°57′21″N 7°31′57″E
- Country: Germany
- State: Rhineland-Palatinate
- District: Rhein-Hunsrück-Kreis
- Municipal assoc.: Simmern-Rheinböllen

Government
  - Mayor (2019–24): Heinz Jürgen Scherer

Area
  - Total: 5.03 km^{2} (1.94 sq mi)
- Elevation: 411 m (1,348 ft)

Population (2025-12-31)
  - Total: 565
  - Density: 112/km^{2} (291/sq mi)
- Time zone: UTC+01:00 (CET)
  - Summer (DST): UTC+02:00 (CEST)
- Postal codes: 55469
- Dialling codes: 06761
- Vehicle registration: SIM

Holzbach (German pronunciation: [ˈhɔlt͡sˌbax]) is an Ortsgemeinde – a municipality belonging to a Verbandsgemeinde, a kind of collective municipality – in the Rhein-Hunsrück-Kreis (district) in Rhineland-Palatinate, Germany. It belongs to the Verbandsgemeinde Simmern-Rheinböllen, whose seat is in Simmern.

== Geography ==
=== Location ===
The municipality lies in the Hunsrück in a landscape with slopes and hollows through which flows the Holzbacher Bach towards Ohlweiler, emptying into the Simmerbach. Some 0.60 km² of the municipal area is wooded, the main type of forest being mixed forest. The rural municipality of Holzbach lies 5 km from the district seat of Simmern.

== History ==
In 1346, Holzbach had its first documentary mention. Archaeological finds from the New Stone Age and Roman times, however, clearly show that the land was settled long before that.

Beginning in 1794, Holzbach lay under French rule. In 1815 it was assigned to the Kingdom of Prussia at the Congress of Vienna. In 1921, the simultaneum at the village church was dissolved, and a new Evangelical church was built in 1926.

During the Second World War, some 100 men from Holzbach were called upon for military service, of whom 25 fell. Some sensation came about from the emergency landing of a German Messerschmitt Bf 109 in 1944. On 16 March 1945, at 7 o’clock in the morning, American tanks reached Holzbach. The village offered no resistance, but houses on the main street were shot up by US troops nonetheless. One person who was trying to flee was killed and one woman was wounded.

Since 1946, Holzbach has been part of the then newly founded state of Rhineland-Palatinate.

== Politics ==
=== Municipal council ===
The council is made up of 12 council members, who were elected by majority vote at the municipal election held on 7 June 2009, and the honorary mayor as chairman.

=== Mayor ===
Holzbach's mayor is Heinz Jürgen Scherer.

== Culture and sightseeing ==
=== Buildings ===
The following are listed buildings or sites in Rhineland-Palatinate's Directory of Cultural Monuments:

- Evangelical church, Kirchstraße 6 – Baroque aisleless church, marked 1759
- Hauptstraße 4 – timber-frame house, plastered and slated, stable, middle or latter half of the 19th century; whole complex of buildings
- Kirchstraße – cast-iron fountain basin with relief; Stromberg Ironworks, marked 1885
- Milestone, on Landesstraße (State Road) 162 going towards Argenthal – so-called Weißer Stein (“White Stone”), Prussian basalt milestone, first third of the 19th century

==== Other sites ====
On Hauptstraße (“Main Street”), which runs through the village, the municipal centre, which is equipped as a multipurpose building, is centrally located. Still standing right nearby is the old Raiffeisen warehouse, where the volunteer fire brigade, the youth fire brigade and the youth centre have set up shop.

=== Natural monuments ===
In Holzbach's outlying countryside stand three old oaktrees, which have been designated as natural monuments.

=== Clubs ===
Holzbach has a sport club that offers various activities: football, table tennis and aerobics. Even the yearly theatre evening is promoted by the club’s members. On the village’s outskirts towards Riesweiler is a sporting ground with a clubhouse. Among other clubs in the municipality are the singing club and the fire brigade promotional club.

=== Culinary specialities ===
In the Holzbach area, Hoolsbacher is well known as a good fruit spirit, mainly made out of the common plum (Prunus domestica domestica). Another speciality is Hoolsbacher Beereflaare, a kind of pastry with bits of dried pear.

== Economy and infrastructure ==
=== Transport ===
Running through Holzbach is Landesstraße (State Road) 108. Landesstraße 168, part of the Deutsche Alleenstraße (Germany’s longest themed holiday road, featuring many Alleen – tree-lined avenues), leads by the village, but not through it. The link to destinations farther afield is Bundesstraße 50, some 3 km from the village. Frankfurt-Hahn Airport lies some 20 km west of Holzbach. The nearest Hauptbahnhöfe are to be found in Koblenz, Bingen, Bad Kreuznach and Mainz.

=== Education ===
The village has no kindergarten of its own, but church kindergartens can be found in Simmern. The municipality lies within the school zone of the primary school in Riesweiler.
