= Külz =

- Municipality
- Coat of arms

- Location of Külz within Rhein-Hunsrück-Kreis district
- Interactive map of Külz
- Location within Germany Location within Rhineland-Palatinate
- Coordinates: 50°0′27″N 7°29′44″E
- Country: Germany
- State: Rhineland-Palatinate
- District: Rhein-Hunsrück-Kreis
- Municipal assoc.: Simmern-Rheinböllen

Government
  - Mayor (2019–24): Bernd Ries

Area
  - Total: 6.92 km^{2} (2.67 sq mi)
- Elevation: 355 m (1,165 ft)

Population (2025-12-31)
  - Total: 490
  - Density: 71/km^{2} (180/sq mi)
- Time zone: UTC+01:00 (CET)
  - Summer (DST): UTC+02:00 (CEST)
- Postal codes: 55471
- Dialling codes: 06761
- Vehicle registration: SIM, GOA
- Website: www.kuelz.de

Külz (German pronunciation: [kʏlts]) is an Ortsgemeinde – a municipality belonging to a Verbandsgemeinde, a kind of collective municipality – in the Rhein-Hunsrück-Kreis (district) in Rhineland-Palatinate, Germany. It belongs to the Verbandsgemeinde Simmern-Rheinböllen, whose seat is in Simmern.

== Geography ==
=== Location ===
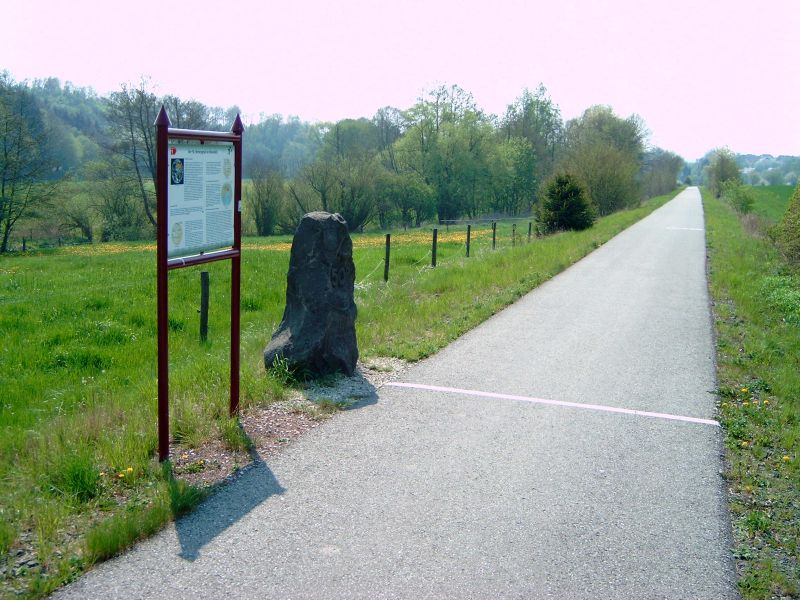
50th parallel of north latitude near Külz

Külz is a rural residential community in the Hunsrück whose buildings are somewhat spread out. The municipality lies in the Külzbach valley and has a Landesstraße (State Road) passing through it. The municipal area measures 6.92 km², of which 1.71 km² is covered by municipal woodlands. Külz lies 350 m above sea level, roughly 4 km northwest of Simmern.

=== Constituent communities ===
Külz has two outlying Ortsteile named Gass and Taubenmühle.

== History ==
The Ortsgemeinde of Külz came into being through the merger of the Ortsteile of Eichkülz on the one hand and Külz with the Ortsteil of Gaß, the boundary between which was the Külzbach, on the other. Eichkülz lay on the brook's right bank in the former territory governed by the provost at Ravengiersburg Monastery. The two other centres over on the brook's left bank, however, lay in the former Imperial territory that King Albrecht pledged to Count Simon II of Sponheim in 1302. These Imperial rights were acquired shortly thereafter by the Elector of the Palatinate.

Researching Külz's history is not easy, as besides the three forms of the name already mentioned, the forms Engeltroutkülz and Osterkülz also crop up in documents. Furthermore, Alterkülz in the Verbandsgemeinde of Kastellaun is sometimes named as In der Külze, Auf der Külze or Külz. To make matters worse, the “Külz” mentioned in 1204, 1293 and 1294 in connection with the Cistercian convent of Chumbd (Kumbd) seems to have been, not today's Külz, but rather a now vanished village that lay on the upper reaches of the Osterkülz. Moreover, Neuerkirch once also bore the name Külz. Only when the church was built could a more exact name be applied to the village: Külz bei der Kirche (“Külz at the Church”).

The part of Külz on the left bank belonged to the parish of Neuerkirch, whereas the part on the right bank belonged to the parish of Biebern. On 30 November 1605, under a decision handed down by the Oberamt of Simmern, Eichkülz was assigned to the parish of Neuerkirch. Today, the Reformed congregation belongs to the parish of Neuerkirch and the Catholic congregation to the parish of Biebern.

Beginning in 1794, Külz lay under French rule. In 1814 it was assigned to the Kingdom of Prussia at the Congress of Vienna. Since 1946, it has been part of the then newly founded state of Rhineland-Palatinate.

== Politics ==
=== Municipal council ===
The council is made up of 12 council members, who were elected by majority vote at the municipal election held on 7 June 2009, and the honorary mayor as chairman.

=== Mayor ===
Külz's mayor is Bernd Ries.

=== Coat of arms ===
The municipality's arms might be described thus: Per fess azure a lion rampant sinister Or armed, langued and crowned gules on the line of partition, his forepaws protecting a church likewise on the line of partition ensigned with a cross on the tower and the roof of the second, the tower and the nave each with two windows in fess sable, and argent an inescutcheon throughout lozengy of the field and of the first, issuant from beneath which three palm leaves each side of the third.

The arms’ composition is drawn from Külz's old court seal (Landeshauptarchiv Koblenz, Bestand 4, Nr. 3453). The Külzer Haufen – the Külz court – comprised not only Külz itself but also Neuerkirch and Niederkumbd.

The lozenges and the lion refer to the former landholders, the Counts Palatine of Simmern and the Electors Palatine. The church is the one in Neuerkirch, which stood in the Schultheißerei of Külz.

As to the palm leaves, their meaning is unclear. Hildegard of Bingen counted them among the healing and food plants. On the other hand, they might simply have been included as a charge to fill in what would otherwise have been two empty spaces either side of the inescutcheon.

== Culture and sightseeing ==
=== Buildings ===
The following are listed buildings or sites in Rhineland-Palatinate’s Directory of Cultural Monuments:

- At Bieberner Straße 2 – dance hall, one-floor timber-frame building, slated, 19th century
- Bieberner Straße 8 – timber-frame house, sided, possibly from the 18th century
- Überbach 7 – estate complex; whole complex of buildings; timber-frame house, partly slated, hipped mansard roof, early 19th century, timber-frame barn, partly solid, marked 1863

=== Sport and leisure ===
Külz lies right on the Schinderhannes-Radweg (cycle path).

== Economy and infrastructure ==
Külz has at its disposal a bakery, two carpentry shops, an inn with a beer garden, a filling station with a shop and a clothing shop. On a hill east of the village stands a wind farm with four Enercon E-82 turbines. Five further facilities are planned.

=== Education ===
The Ortsgemeinde of Külz, in collaboration with four other municipalities, runs a kindergarten located in neighbouring Alterkülz.
