= Kisselbach =

- Municipality
- Coat of arms

- Location of Kisselbach within Rhein-Hunsrück-Kreis district
- Interactive map of Kisselbach
- Location within Germany Location within Rhineland-Palatinate
- Coordinates: 50°03′08″N 7°36′38″E
- Country: Germany
- State: Rhineland-Palatinate
- District: Rhein-Hunsrück-Kreis
- Municipal assoc.: Simmern-Rheinböllen

Government
  - Mayor (2019–24): Christine Düster

Area
  - Total: 9.13 km^{2} (3.53 sq mi)
- Elevation: 400 m (1,300 ft)

Population (2025-12-31)
  - Total: 598
  - Density: 65.5/km^{2} (170/sq mi)
- Time zone: UTC+01:00 (CET)
  - Summer (DST): UTC+02:00 (CEST)
- Postal codes: 56291
- Dialling codes: 06766
- Vehicle registration: SIM
- Website: www.kisselbach.org

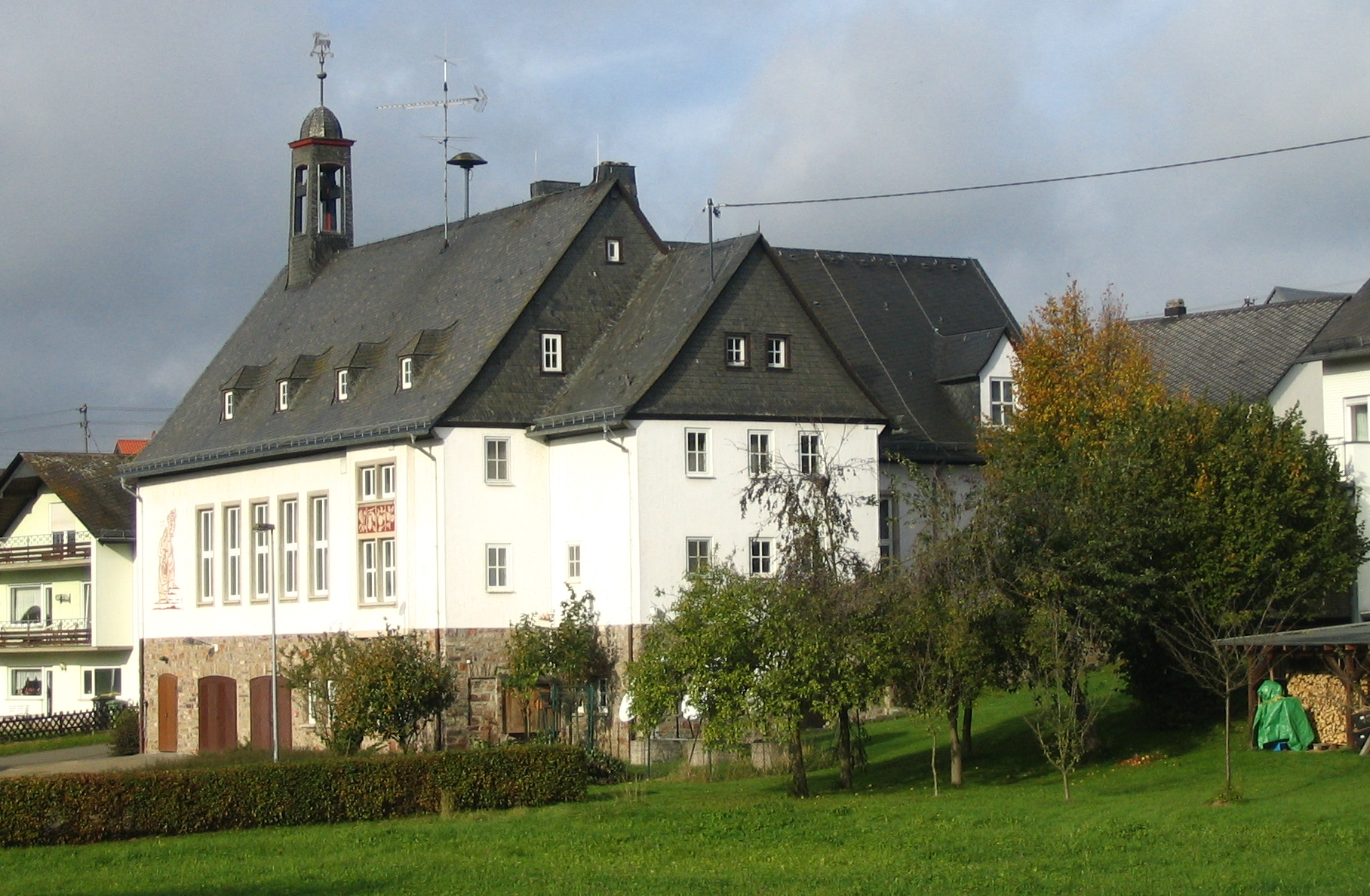
Community centre in the middle of the village on the bank of the Simmerbach

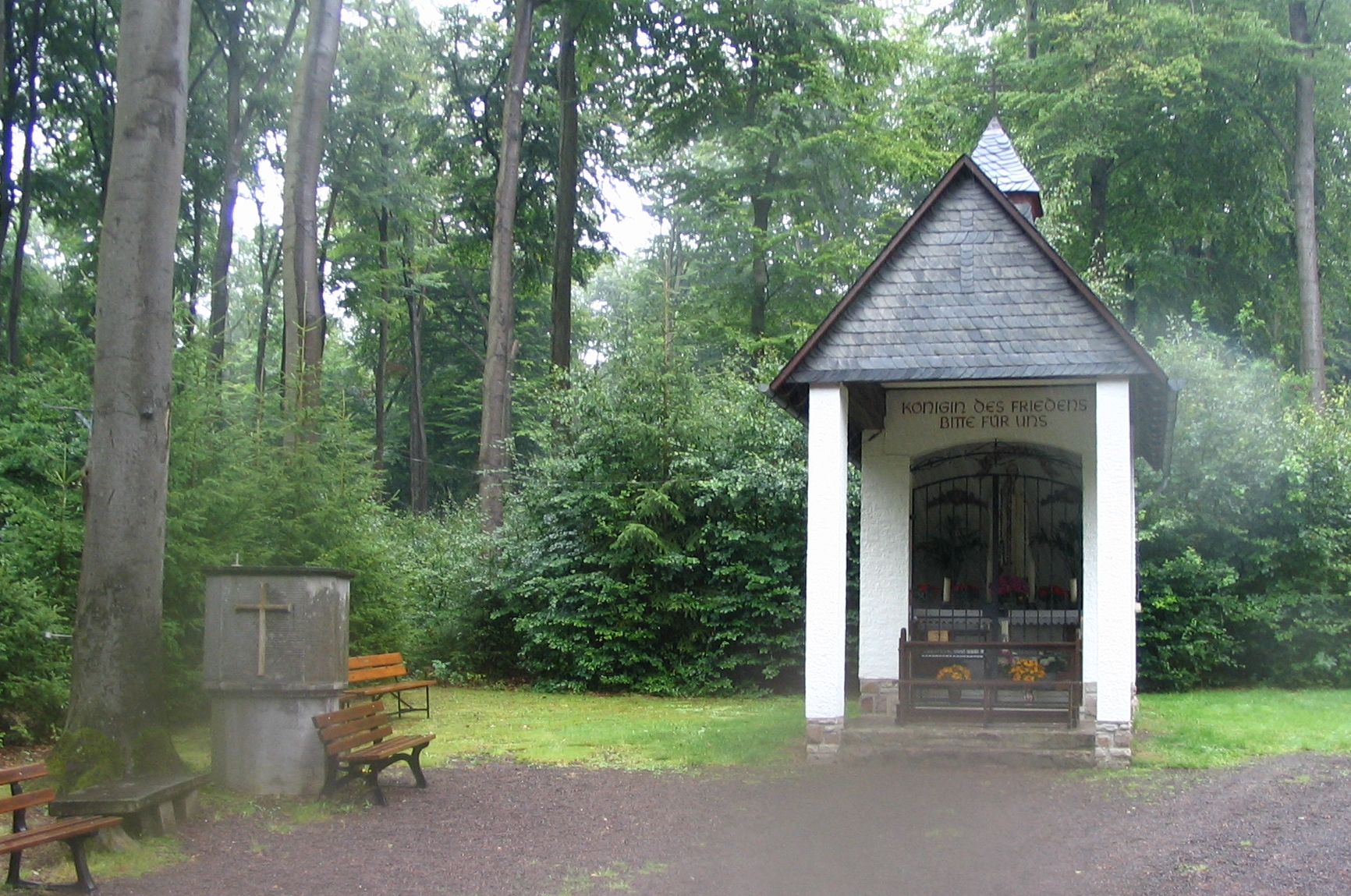
Forest Chapel, southwest of the village

Kisselbach (German pronunciation: [ˈkɪsl̩bax]) is an Ortsgemeinde – a municipality belonging to a Verbandsgemeinde, a kind of collective municipality – in the Rhein-Hunsrück-Kreis (district) in Rhineland-Palatinate, Germany. It belongs to the Verbandsgemeinde Simmern-Rheinböllen, whose seat is in Simmern.

== Geography ==
=== Location ===
The municipality lies in the eastern Hunsrück at the foot of the Soonwald, a heavily wooded section of the Hunsrück, and some 15 km from the Rhine. The Simmerbach flows through the village. Kisselbach is the northernmost municipality in the Verbandsgemeinde of Rheinböllen.

== History ==
In 1240, Kisselbach had its first documentary mention and from times of yore it was split by the Simmerbach into two like-named villages, one of which belonged to the Archbishopric of Trier while the other was held by Electoral Palatinate. Beginning in 1794, both villages lay under French rule. In 1814, they were assigned to the Kingdom of Prussia at the Congress of Vienna. The separate administration continued until 1939, when the two municipalities united. Since 1946, it has been part of the then newly founded state of Rhineland-Palatinate.

=== Population development ===
The table lists population figures for Kisselbach from selected years since the Congress of Vienna (at 31 December each time):

Historical population

Year	Pop.	±%
1815	410	—
1835	545	+32.9%
1871	541	−0.7%
1905	544	+0.6%
1939	478	−12.1%
1950	511	+6.9%
1961	504	−1.4%

Year	Pop.	±%
1965	530	+5.2%
1970	542	+2.3%
1975	510	−5.9%
1980	476	−6.7%
1985	475	−0.2%
1987	530	+11.6%
1990	534	+0.8%

Year	Pop.	±%
1995	554	+3.7%
2000	575	+3.8%
2005	587	+2.1%
2006	561	−4.4%
2009	557	−0.7%

== Politics ==
=== Municipal council ===
The council is made up of 12 council members, who were elected by majority vote at the municipal election held on 7 June 2009, and the honorary mayor as chairman.

=== Mayor ===
Kisselbach's mayor is Christine Düster.

=== Coat of arms ===
The German blazon reads: Unter goldenem Schildhaupt, darin ein rotbewehrter, schwarzer Adler, schräglinke Wellenteilung. Vorne in Schwarz ein goldener, rotgezungter und bewehrter Löwe nach links, hinten rotes Balkenkreuz in Silber.

The municipality's arms might in English heraldic language be described thus: Per bend sinister wavy sable a lion rampant sinister Or armed and langued gules and argent a cross of the third, on a chief of the second an eagle displayed of the first armed of the third.

The black eagle in the chief recalls the Imperial immediacy formerly held by “Königs-Kisselbach” (“King’s Kisselbach”). The wavy line of partition symbolizes the Simmerbach, which divided what was once two villages, both named Kisselbach: Diesseits (roughly “On This Side” or “Over Here”), as the Electoral-Palatinate side was called, is represented by the Palatine Lion on the dexter (armsbearer's right, viewer's left) side, while Jenseits (roughly “On That Side” or “Over There”), as the Electoral-Trier side was called, is represented by the Trier cross on the sinister (armsbearer's left, viewer's right) side.

== Culture and sightseeing ==
=== Buildings ===
The following are listed buildings or sites in Rhineland-Palatinate’s Directory of Cultural Monuments:

- Saint Apollonia’s Catholic Church (St.-Apollonia-Kirche), Liebshausener Straße – originally three-naved, now one-naved Gothic Revival column basilica, after 1912; whole complex of buildings with graveyard

=== Other buildings ===
Another building worth seeing in Kisselbach is the Waldkapelle (“Forest Chapel”) consecrated to Mary, to which a procession of lights is made on the 13th day of every month from May to October by the local Catholic congregation.

=== Clubs ===
In Kisselbach there are a sport club with a tennis department, a volunteer fire brigade, a theatrical club and the Catholic Church's singing club. As well, Kisselbach has at its disposal its own open channel.

== Economy and infrastructure ==
=== Transport ===
Kisselbach lies near the Autobahn A 61, Laudert/Kisselbach interchange.
