= Biebern =

- Municipality
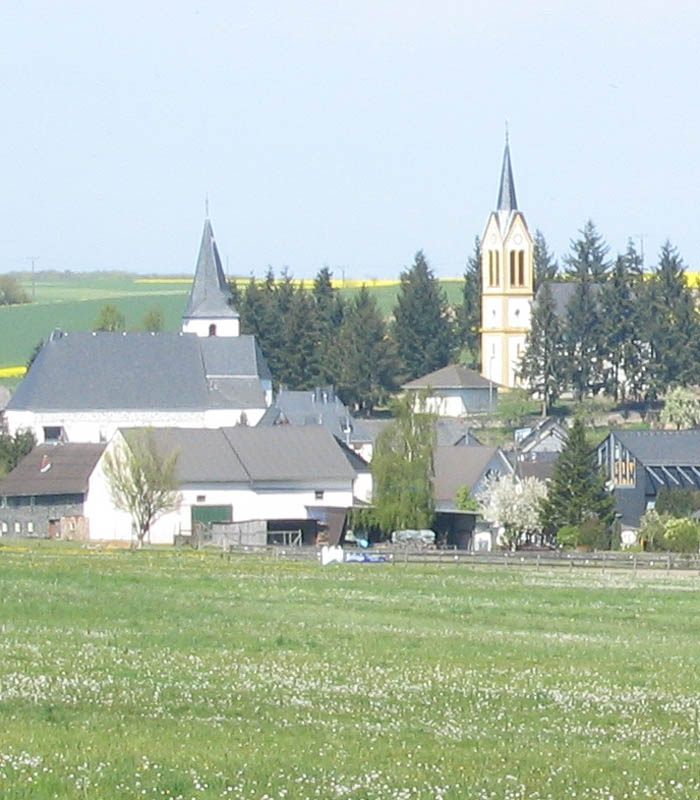

- Coat of arms

- Location of Biebern within Rhein-Hunsrück-Kreis district
- Interactive map of Biebern
- Location within Germany Location within Rhineland-Palatinate
- Coordinates: 49°59′34.4″N 7°26′33.65″E
- Country: Germany
- State: Rhineland-Palatinate
- District: Rhein-Hunsrück-Kreis
- Municipal assoc.: Simmern-Rheinböllen

Government
  - Mayor (2021–24): Marco Schömehl

Area
  - Total: 4.1 km^{2} (1.6 sq mi)
- Elevation: 400 m (1,300 ft)

Population (2025-12-31)
  - Total: 310
  - Density: 76/km^{2} (200/sq mi)
- Time zone: UTC+01:00 (CET)
  - Summer (DST): UTC+02:00 (CEST)
- Postal codes: 55471
- Dialling codes: 06761
- Vehicle registration: SIM
- Website: www.biebern.de

Biebern (German pronunciation: [ˈbiːbɐn]) is an Ortsgemeinde – a municipality belonging to a Verbandsgemeinde, a kind of collective municipality – in the Rhein-Hunsrück-Kreis (district) in Rhineland-Palatinate, Germany. It belongs to the Verbandsgemeinde Simmern-Rheinböllen, whose seat is in Simmern.

== Geography ==
=== Location ===
The municipality lies in the central Hunsrück in the Bieber (Bieberbach) valley between Bundesstraße 50 and the Hunsrückhöhenstraße (“Hunsrück Heights Road”, a scenic road across the Hunsrück built originally as a military road on Hermann Göring’s orders). Biebern lies about 7 km west of the district seat of Simmern, and about 70 km west of the state capital of Mainz.

== History ==
Archaeological finds from Roman times show that the Biebern area was settled quite early on. Furthermore, the oldest document from anywhere in the Vorderhunsrück (“Fore-Hunsrück”) deals with Biebern. According to this document, dated 15 June 754, a man named Eggiolt donated, among other things, a share of his woodlands at Bibarahu in pago Nafinsie (or Biebern im Nahegau, as it is rendered in German – “Biebern in the Nahe region”) to Fulda Abbey for his own and his brother's salvation. Based on this document's date, the municipality of Biebern celebrated its 1,250-year jubilee in 2004. A 1026 document mentions a chapel in Biebern, making Biebern one of the Hunsrück's oldest church centres. In 1076, two years after the Augustinian canonical foundation was founded, Biebern, and thereby the Bieber valley too, came into the Ravengiersburg Monastery's ownership, binding the village's history thereafter with the foundation's, until this was dissolved in 1566 by Duke Georg of Simmern. Biebern was the centre of this monastic region on the Moselle. In administration and jurisdiction, Biebern played a special rôle, with the tithe court and blood court holding their assizes on the Itzelbach Heights at Biebern.

Until 1673, Biebern belonged to the Electorate of the Palatinate constituent Duchy of Palatinate-Simmern, and after this time, directly to the Electorate of the Palatinate. In 1689, a simultaneum was introduced into Biebern; Catholics and Protestants were still having to share a church about 1770. Beginning in 1794, Biebern lay under French rule. In 1815 it was assigned to the Kingdom of Prussia at the Congress of Vienna. In 1939, the old Bürgermeisterei (“Mayoralty”) of Ohlweiler was dissolved and Biebern passed to the Bürgermeisterei of Simmern. Since 1946, it has been part of the then newly founded state of Rhineland-Palatinate.

== Politics ==
=== Municipal council ===
The council is made up of 8 council members, who were elected by majority vote at the municipal election held on 7 June 2009, and the honorary mayor as chairman.

=== Mayor ===
Biebern's mayor is Marco Schömehl, installed in 2021.

=== Coat of arms ===
The German blazon reads: Von Silber und Blau gespalten; vorne ein durchgehendes schwarzes Kreuz, hinten eine silberne Waage, darüber zwei Kirchen.

The municipality's arms might in English heraldic language be described thus: Per pale argent a cross sable and azure balances below two churches all of the first.

The black cross on the silver field on the dexter (armsbearer's right, viewer's left) side refers to the Imperially immediate Benedictine Fulda Abbey, to which the nobleman Eggiolt bequeathed his woodlands in Biebern in 754. The two churches on the sinister (armsbearer's left, viewer's right) side refer to the two in the municipality. The balances, also on the sinister side, stand for the court at Biebern, held under the Ravengiersburg Augustinian canonical foundation's auspices.

== Culture and sightseeing ==
=== Buildings ===
The following are listed buildings or sites in Rhineland-Palatinate’s Directory of Cultural Monuments:

- Evangelical church, Schulstraße – Baroque aisleless church, marked 1769, west tower 1896; whole complex of buildings with graveyard, 19th century; Gothic Revival Schäfer tomb, 1893
- Saint John the Baptist’s Catholic Parish Church (Pfarrkirche St. Johannes der Täufer), Kirchstraße – Late Gothic polygonal quire, flanking quire tower with Baroque cupola, portal 1770
- Am Heckenborn 5 – Quereinhaus (a combination residential and commercial house divided for these two purposes down the middle, perpendicularly to the street), timber framing plastered, essentially from the 18th century, conversion in the 19th century
- Beside Heinzenbacher Straße 1a – L-shaped estate; timber-frame house, plastered, early 19th century; whole complex of buildings
- Heinzenbacher Straße/corner of Raiffeisenstraße – warriors’ memorial, pylon with soldier
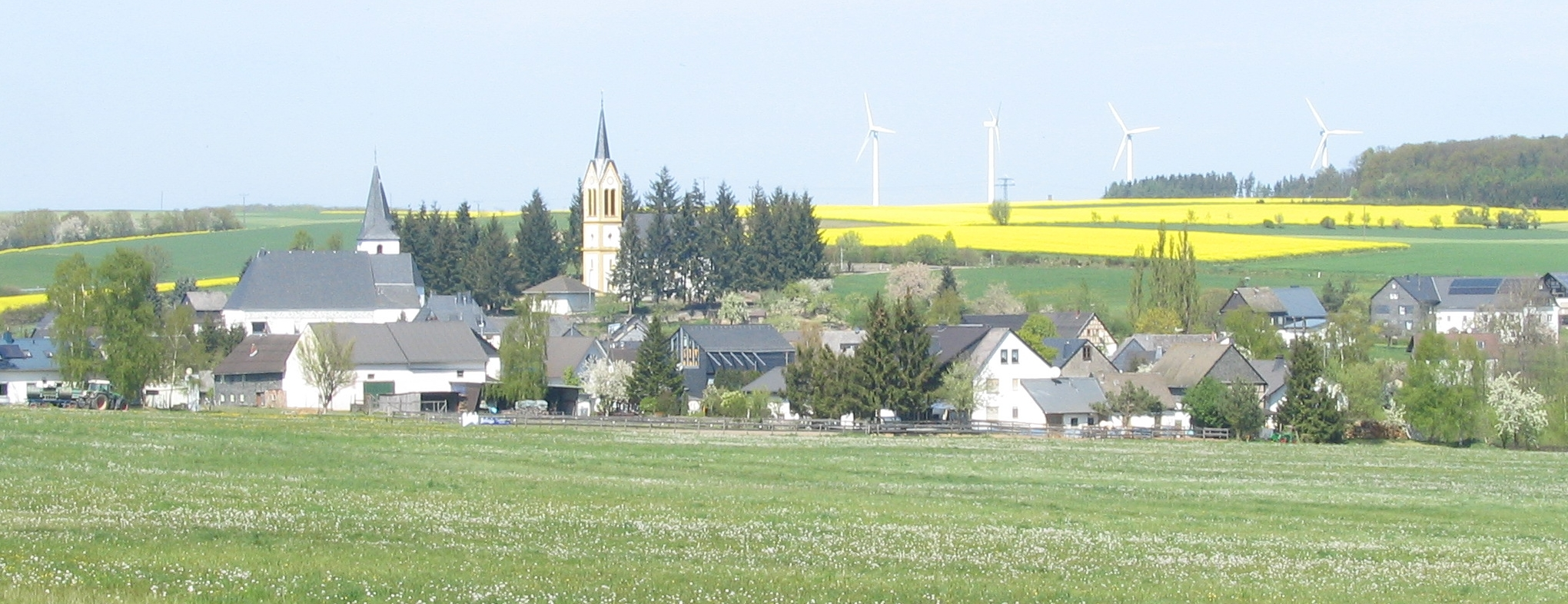
Biebern in summer

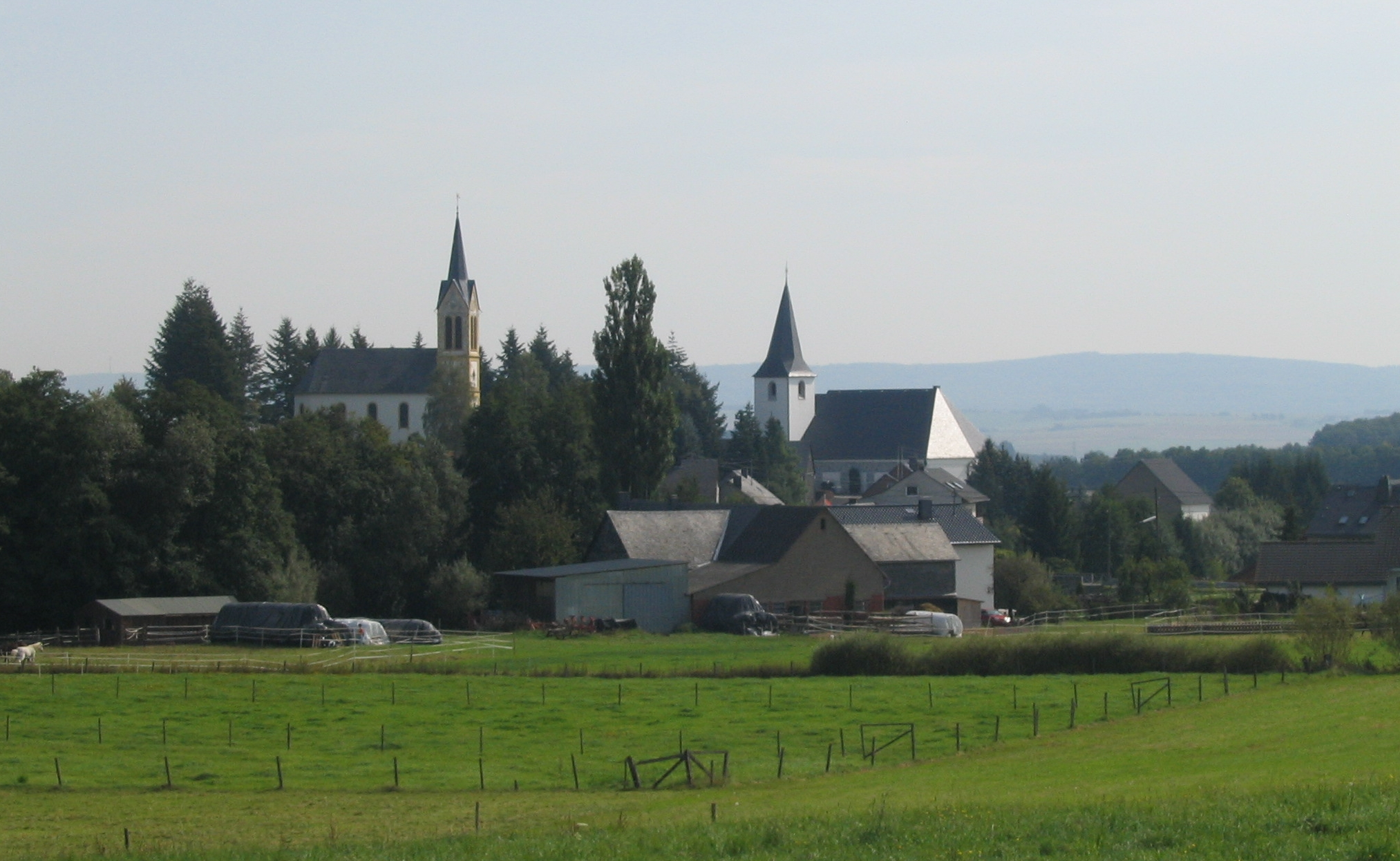
Biebern's two churches

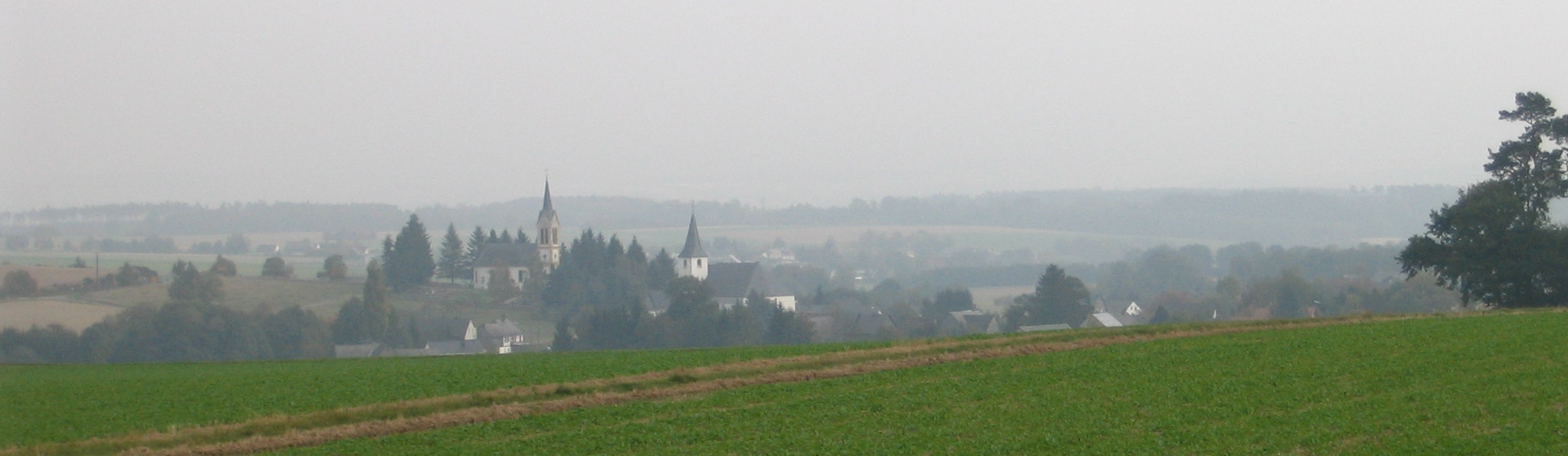
Bieber valley

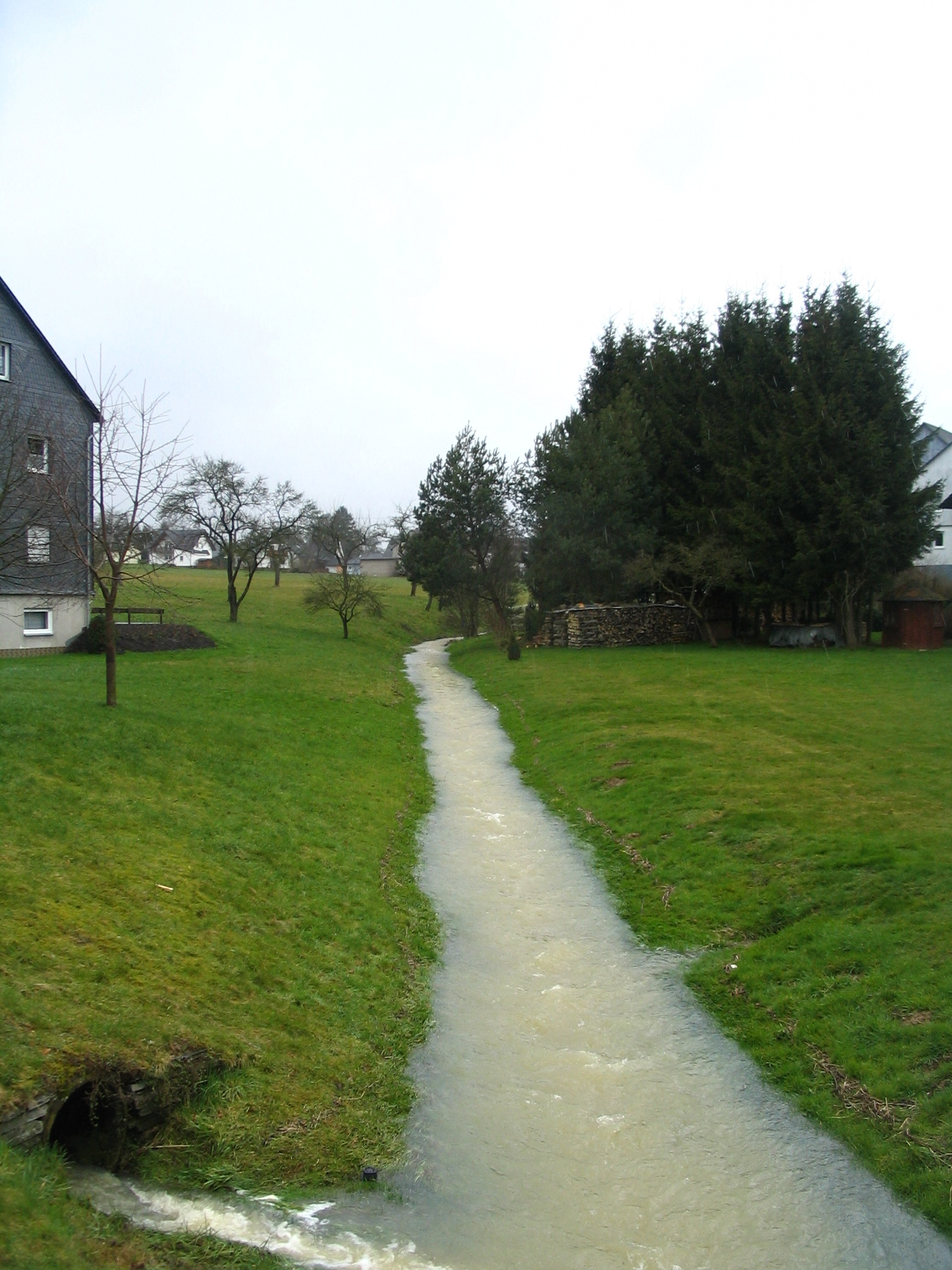
Bieberbach

== Economy and infrastructure ==
=== Transport ===
Biebern lies about 4 km from Bundesstraße 42 and about 15 km from Frankfurt-Hahn Airport.
