= Steinbach, Rhein-Hunsrück =

Steinbach
- Municipality
- Location of Steinbach within Rhein-Hunsrück-Kreis district
- Interactive map of Steinbach
- Location within Germany Location within Rhineland-Palatinate
- Coordinates: 50°2′41″N 7°35′43″E
- Country: Germany
- State: Rhineland-Palatinate
- District: Rhein-Hunsrück-Kreis
- Municipal assoc.: Simmern-Rheinböllen

Government
  - Mayor (2019–24): Michael Schubach

Area
  - Total: 2.6 km^{2} (1.0 sq mi)
- Elevation: 400 m (1,300 ft)

Population (2025-12-31)
  - Total: 139
  - Density: 53/km^{2} (140/sq mi)
- Time zone: UTC+01:00 (CET)
  - Summer (DST): UTC+02:00 (CEST)
- Postal codes: 56291
- Dialling codes: 06766
- Vehicle registration: SIM

Steinbach (German pronunciation: [ˈʃtaɪnbax]) is an Ortsgemeinde – a municipality belonging to a Verbandsgemeinde, a kind of collective municipality – in the Rhein-Hunsrück-Kreis (district) in Rhineland-Palatinate, Germany. It belongs to the Verbandsgemeinde Simmern-Rheinböllen, whose seat is in Simmern.

== Geography ==
=== Location ===
The municipality lies in the Hunsrück on the northwest slope of the Simmerbach valley, roughly 8 km northeast of Simmern and 7 km northwest of Rheinböllen. Steinbach's municipal area measures 2.60 km^{2}, of which 0.91 km^{2} is wooded.

== History ==
Beginning in 1794, Steinbach lay under French rule. In 1814 it was assigned to the Kingdom of Prussia at the Congress of Vienna. Since 1946, it has been part of the then newly founded state of Rhineland-Palatinate.

=== Population development ===
What follows is a table of the municipality's population figures for selected years since the early 19th century (each time at 31 December):

Historical population

Year	Pop.	±%
1815	162	—
1835	151	−6.8%
1871	132	−12.6%
1905	127	−3.8%
1939	120	−5.5%
1950	128	+6.7%
1961	122	−4.7%

Year	Pop.	±%
1965	124	+1.6%
1970	116	−6.5%
1975	91	−21.6%
1980	93	+2.2%
1985	83	−10.8%
1987	105	+26.5%
1990	106	+1.0%

Year	Pop.	±%
1995	106	+0.0%
2000	114	+7.5%
2005	118	+3.5%
2006	115	−2.5%
2009	118	+2.6%

Source: Statistisches Landesamt Rheinland-Pfalz

== Politics ==
=== Municipal council ===
The council is made up of 6 council members, who were elected by majority vote at the municipal election held on 7 June 2009, and the honorary mayor as chairman.

=== Mayor ===
Steinbach's mayor is Michael Schubach.
