= Reich, Germany =

Reich
- Municipality
- Location of Reich within Rhein-Hunsrück-Kreis district
- Interactive map of Reich
- Location within Germany Location within Rhineland-Palatinate
- Coordinates: 50°0′17″N 7°25′58″E
- Country: Germany
- State: Rhineland-Palatinate
- District: Rhein-Hunsrück-Kreis
- Municipal assoc.: Simmern-Rheinböllen

Government
  - Mayor (2019–24): Gerhard Schneider

Area
  - Total: 4.76 km^{2} (1.84 sq mi)
- Elevation: 410 m (1,350 ft)

Population (2025-12-31)
  - Total: 361
  - Density: 75.8/km^{2} (196/sq mi)
- Time zone: UTC+01:00 (CET)
  - Summer (DST): UTC+02:00 (CEST)
- Postal codes: 55471
- Dialling codes: 06761
- Vehicle registration: SIM

Reich (German pronunciation: [ʁaɪç]) is an Ortsgemeinde – a municipality belonging to a Verbandsgemeinde, a kind of collective municipality – in the Rhein-Hunsrück-Kreis (district) in Rhineland-Palatinate, Germany. It belongs to the Verbandsgemeinde Simmern-Rheinböllen, whose seat is in Simmern.

== Geography ==
=== Location ===
The municipality lies in the Hunsrück, in a hollow in the Biebertal (Bieberbach valley). The rural residential community lies roughly 6 km north-northeast of Kirchberg and 7 km west-northwest of Simmern.

== History ==
In the mid 16th century, Reich had its first documentary mention in a Weistum from the Ravengiersburg Monastery (a Weistum – cognate with English wisdom – was a legal pronouncement issued by men learned in law in the Middle Ages and early modern times). With the monastery's dissolution and the introduction of the Reformation, the village passed to the Duchy of Palatinate-Simmern, and then in 1673 to Electoral Palatinate. Beginning in 1794, Reich lay under French rule. In 1814 it was assigned to the Kingdom of Prussia at the Congress of Vienna. Since 1946, it has been part of the then newly founded state of Rhineland-Palatinate.

== Politics ==
=== Municipal council ===
The council is made up of 8 council members, who were elected by majority vote at the municipal election held on 7 June 2009, and the honorary mayor as chairman.

=== Mayor ===
Reich's mayor is Gerhard Schneider.

=== Coat of arms ===
The municipality's arms might be described thus: Sable a fess countercompony gules and argent between an oaktree eradicated Or and a lion passant of the same armed and langued of the second.

== Culture and sightseeing ==
=== Buildings ===
The following are listed buildings or sites in Rhineland-Palatinate’s Directory of Cultural Monuments:

- Auf dem Wasem – memorial site for the victims of the First and Second World Wars; small complex with oaktrees, memorial stone and crosses
- Hauptstraße 20 – former school between Reich and Wüschheim; timber-frame building, partly slated, about 1910

=== Sport and leisure ===
Running through the village is the newly built Biebertaler Rundweg (path).
