= Liebshausen =

- Municipality
- Coat of arms

- Location of Liebshausen within Rhein-Hunsrück-Kreis district
- Interactive map of Liebshausen
- Location within Germany Location within Rhineland-Palatinate
- Coordinates: 50°2′00″N 7°37′50″E
- Country: Germany
- State: Rhineland-Palatinate
- District: Rhein-Hunsrück-Kreis
- Municipal assoc.: Simmern-Rheinböllen

Government
  - Mayor (2019–24): Matthias Merscher

Area
  - Total: 5.85 km^{2} (2.26 sq mi)
- Elevation: 460 m (1,510 ft)

Population (2025-12-31)
  - Total: 502
  - Density: 85.8/km^{2} (222/sq mi)
- Time zone: UTC+01:00 (CET)
  - Summer (DST): UTC+02:00 (CEST)
- Postal codes: 55494
- Dialling codes: 06764
- Vehicle registration: SIM
- Website: www.liebshausen.de

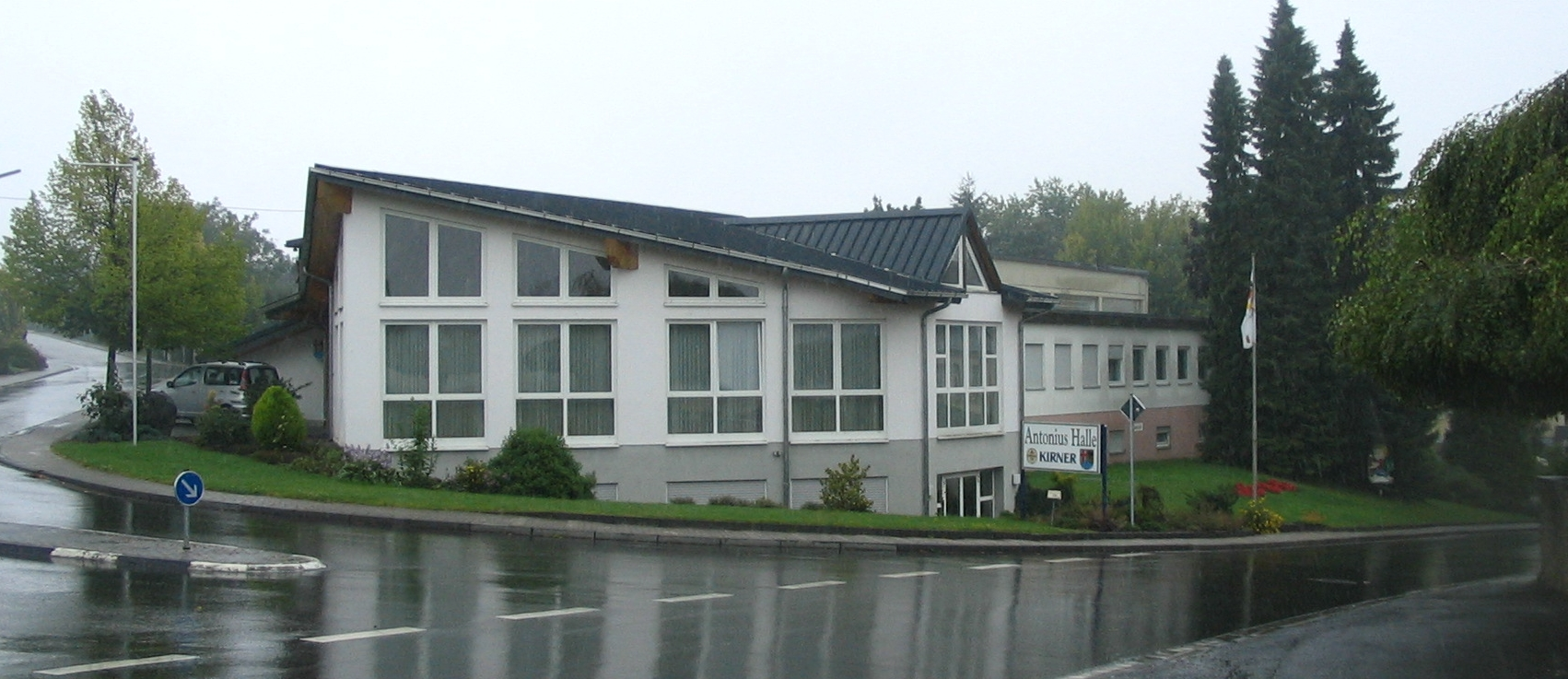
Antoniushalle, Liebshausen

Liebshausen is an Ortsgemeinde – a municipality belonging to a Verbandsgemeinde', a kind of collective municipality – in the Rhein-Hunsrück-Kreis (district) in Rhineland-Palatinate, Germany. It belongs to the Verbandsgemeinde Simmern-Rheinböllen, whose seat is in Simmern.

== Geography ==
=== Location ===
The municipality lies in the Hunsrück roughly 4 km northwest of Rheinböllen and 10 km west-southwest of the Rhine at Bacharach. Liebshausen lies just west of the Autobahn A 61. The municipal area measures 548 ha, of which 5 ha is wooded.

== History ==
In 1006, Liebshausen had its first documentary mention on the occasion of a church consecration in Mörschbach. Beginning in 1794, Liebshausen lay under French rule. In 1814 it was assigned to the Kingdom of Prussia at the Congress of Vienna. Since 1946, it has been part of the then newly founded state of Rhineland-Palatinate.

Liebshausen was said in the late 18th century to be a favourite hideout among robbers and horse thieves. It was here that the robber Philipp Ludwig Mosebach (“Jäger-Philipp”, Jäger being German for “hunter” or “rifleman”), a clergyman's ne’er-do-well son and the leader of the Hunsrück-Bande, a lawless gang, stayed. Mosebach was eventually put to death in Koblenz. The notorious outlaw Johannes Bückler, or “Schinderhannes”, to use the nickname by which he is best known, came early on in his career of lawlessness to Liebshausen, where he was wounded in a brawl at an inn when somebody fired a shotgun at him.

=== Population development ===
What follows is a table of population figures for Liebshausen from selected years since the Congress of Vienna (at 31 December each time):

Historical population

Year	Pop.	±%
1815	260	—
1835	371	+42.7%
1871	356	−4.0%
1905	352	−1.1%
1939	400	+13.6%
1950	411	+2.8%
1961	378	−8.0%

Year	Pop.	±%
1965	358	−5.3%
1970	424	+18.4%
1975	369	−13.0%
1980	345	−6.5%
1985	334	−3.2%
1987	345	+3.3%
1990	342	−0.9%

Year	Pop.	±%
1995	414	+21.1%
2000	480	+15.9%
2005	523	+9.0%
2006	519	−0.8%
2009	505	−2.7%

Source: Statistisches Landesamt Rheinland-Pfalz

== Politics ==
=== Municipal council ===
The council is made up of 12 council members, who were elected by majority vote at the municipal election held on 7 June 2009, and the honorary mayor as chairwoman.

=== Mayor ===
Liebshausen's mayor is Matthias Merscher.

=== Coat of arms ===
The municipality's arms might be described thus: Tierced in mantle dexter argent a cross gules, sinister Or an eagle displayed sable armed and langued of the second, and in base azure a bell hanging from its yoke of the first.

== Culture and sightseeing ==
=== Buildings ===
The following are listed buildings or sites in Rhineland-Palatinate’s Directory of Cultural Monuments:

- Saint Anthony the Hermit’s Catholic Church (branch church; Filialkirche Hl. Antonius Eremit), Hauptstraße 10 – 1821–1825, architect Royal Building Inspector Maeber, thereafter F. Nebel, Koblenz, belltower 1873, new building work on nave 1950; in the quire a Crucifix, Body of Christ from early 17th century
- Hauptstraße 9 – former inn "Caspar"; timber-frame building, partly solid or slated, mid 19th century
