= Schönborn, Rhein-Hunsrück =

Schönborn
- Municipality
- Coat of arms

- Location of Schönborn within Rhein-Hunsrück-Kreis district
- Interactive map of Schönborn
- Location within Germany Location within Rhineland-Palatinate
- Coordinates: 49°57′30″N 7°28′29″E
- Country: Germany
- State: Rhineland-Palatinate
- District: Rhein-Hunsrück-Kreis
- Municipal assoc.: Simmern-Rheinböllen

Government
  - Mayor (2019–24): Manfred Gruhn

Area
  - Total: 3.9 km^{2} (1.5 sq mi)
- Elevation: 360 m (1,180 ft)

Population (2025-12-31)
  - Total: 287
  - Density: 74/km^{2} (190/sq mi)
- Time zone: UTC+01:00 (CET)
  - Summer (DST): UTC+02:00 (CEST)
- Postal codes: 55469
- Dialling codes: 06761
- Vehicle registration: SIM

Schönborn (German pronunciation: [ˈʃøːnbɔʁn]) is an Ortsgemeinde – a municipality belonging to a Verbandsgemeinde, a kind of collective municipality – in the Rhein-Hunsrück-Kreis (district) in Rhineland-Palatinate, Germany. It belongs to the Verbandsgemeinde Simmern-Rheinböllen, whose seat is in Simmern.

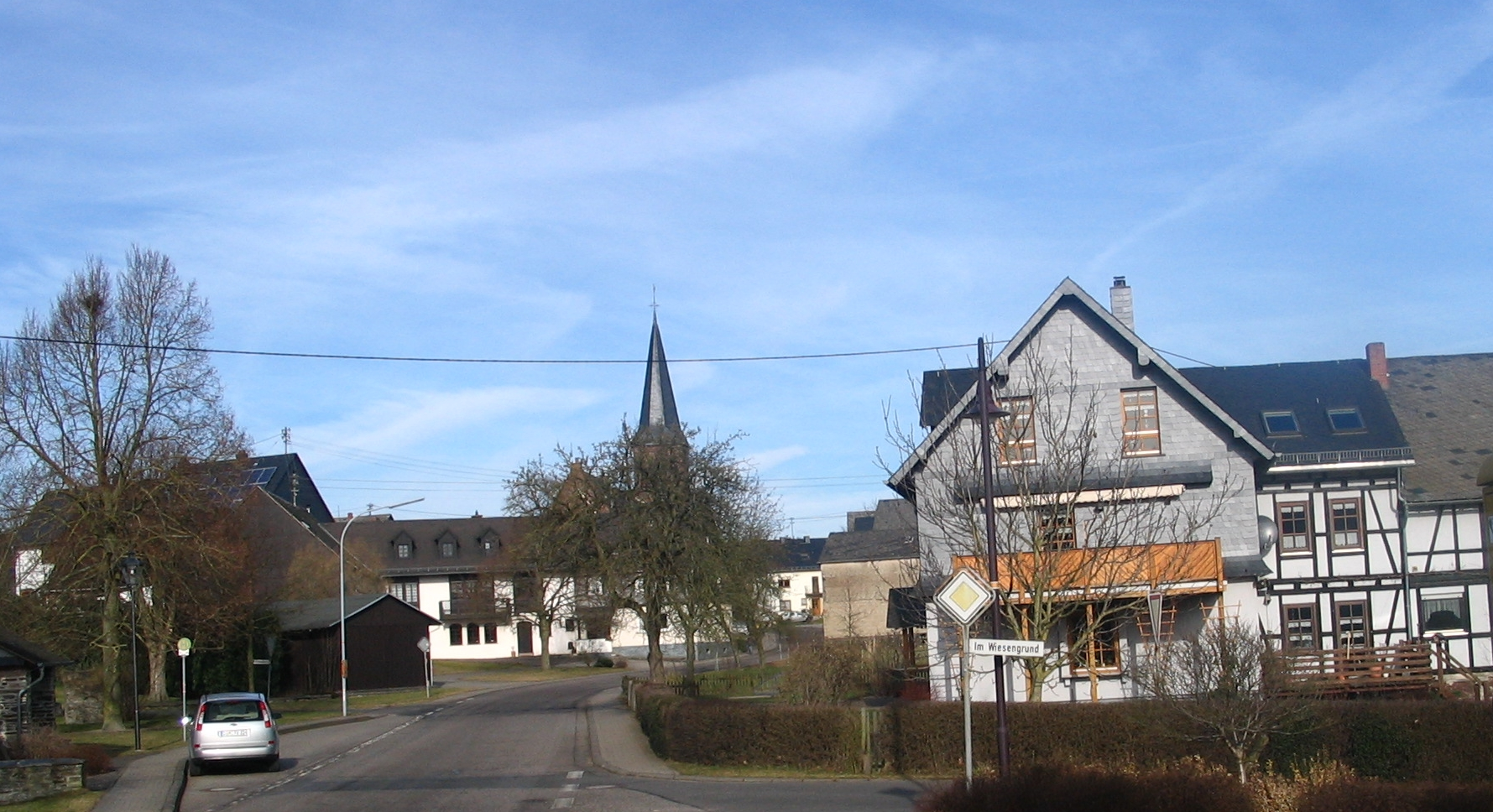
Schönborn

== Geography ==
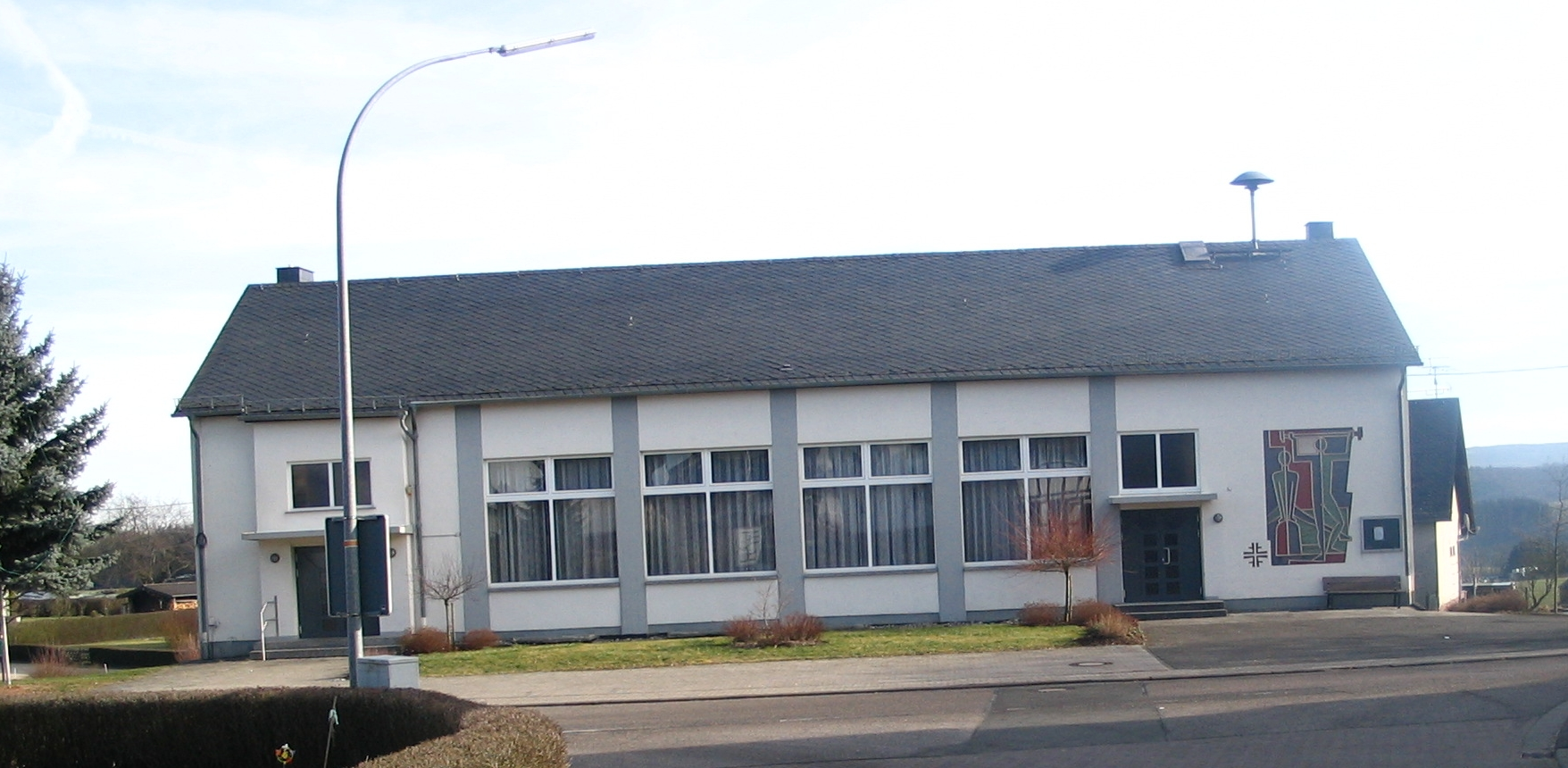
Municipal centre

=== Location ===
The municipality lies in the central Hunsrück between the Kauerbach and Simmerbach valleys. To the east lies Simmern, some 4 km away, and to the west, Kirchberg, also some 4 km away.

== History ==
Archaeological finds are known from as early as Late La Tène times. In 1290, Schönborn had its first documentary mention. The village was part of Palatinate-Simmern and, beginning in 1673, Electoral Palatinate. Beginning in 1794, Schönborn lay under French rule. In 1814 it was assigned to the Kingdom of Prussia at the Congress of Vienna. Since 1946, it has been part of the then newly founded state of Rhineland-Palatinate.

== Politics ==
=== Municipal council ===
The council is made up of 6 council members, who were elected by majority vote at the municipal election held on 7 June 2009, and the honorary mayor as chairman.

=== Mayor ===
Schönborn's mayor is Manfred Gruhn.

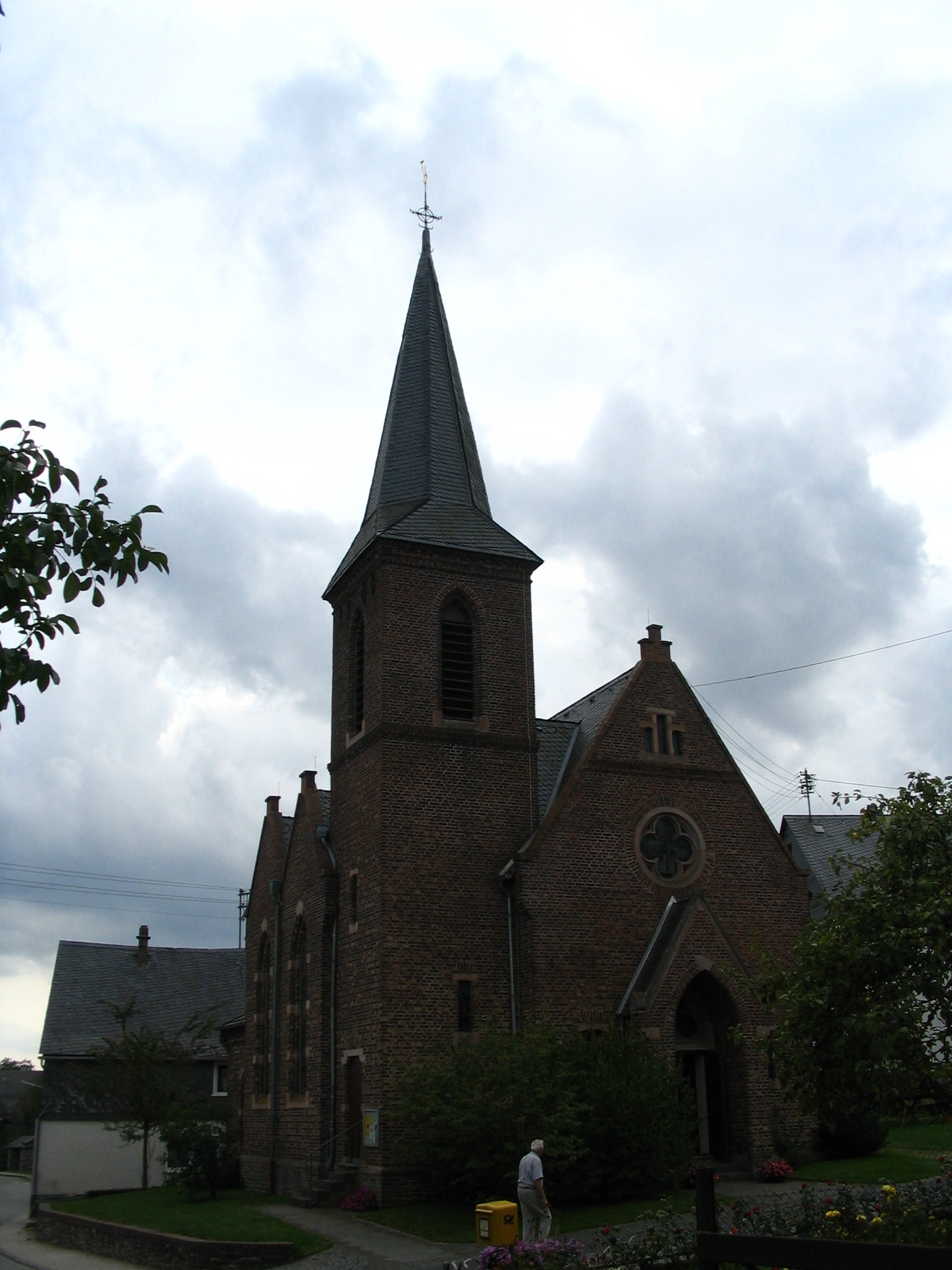
Hauptstraße 10: Evangelical church

== Culture and sightseeing ==
=== Buildings ===
The following are listed buildings or sites in Rhineland-Palatinate's Directory of Cultural Monuments:

- Evangelical church, Hauptstraße 10 – Gothic Revival brick building, 1899
