= Neuerkirch =

- Municipality
- Coat of arms

- Location of Neuerkirch within Rhein-Hunsrück-Kreis district
- Interactive map of Neuerkirch
- Location within Germany Location within Rhineland-Palatinate
- Coordinates: 50°01′00″N 7°29′00″E
- Country: Germany
- State: Rhineland-Palatinate
- District: Rhein-Hunsrück-Kreis
- Municipal assoc.: Simmern-Rheinböllen

Government
  - Mayor (2019–24): Volker Wichter

Area
  - Total: 5.28 km^{2} (2.04 sq mi)
- Elevation: 360 m (1,180 ft)

Population (2025-12-31)
  - Total: 325
  - Density: 61.6/km^{2} (159/sq mi)
- Time zone: UTC+01:00 (CET)
  - Summer (DST): UTC+02:00 (CEST)
- Postal codes: 55471
- Dialling codes: 06761
- Vehicle registration: SIM
- Website: www.neuerkirch.de

Neuerkirch is an Ortsgemeinde – a municipality belonging to a Verbandsgemeinde, a kind of collective municipality – in the Rhein-Hunsrück-Kreis (district) in Rhineland-Palatinate, Germany. It belongs to the Verbandsgemeinde Simmern-Rheinböllen, whose seat is in Simmern.

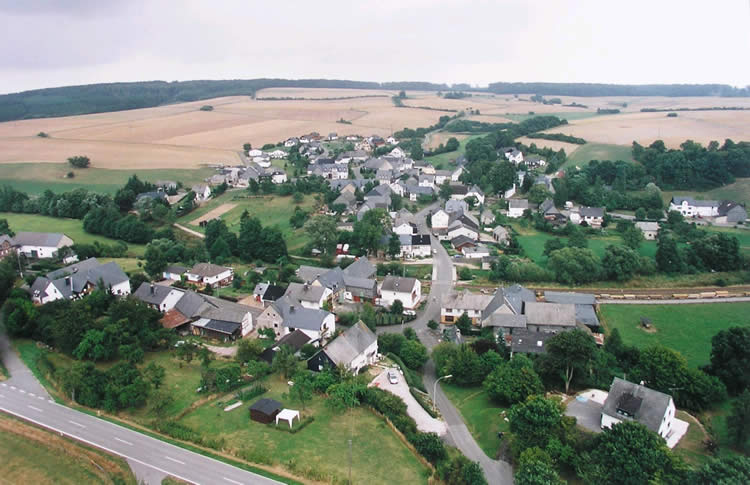
Neuerkirch seen from above, looking from the west; the Schinderhannes-Radweg is clearly visible

== Geography ==
=== Location ===
The municipality lies in the central Hunsrück between Simmern and Kastellaun, right on the Schinderhannes-Radweg (cycle path) at a mean elevation of 360 m above sea level. Lands used for agriculture cover 250 ha, and those that are wooded 200 ha. The Külzbach flows through the village. This brook was once held to be the boundary between two originally separate villages, Neuerkirch diesseits and Neuerkirch jenseits (diesseits and jenseits meaning “on this side” and “on that side” respectively).

== History ==
Archaeological finds from the New Stone Age bear witness to settlement on the site where the village now stands. In 1302, Neuerkirch had its first documentary mention. Neuerkirch “on that side” of the Külzbach long belonged to the Duchy of Palatinate-Zweibrücken, while Neuerkirch “on this side” of the Külzbach belonged to Palatinate-Simmern and Electoral Palatinate. Beginning in 1794, Neuerkirch lay under French rule. In 1814 it was assigned to the Kingdom of Prussia at the Congress of Vienna. After the First World War, Neuerkirch was temporarily occupied by the French once again. Until 1938, the two villages each side of the Külzbach remained administratively separate. Since 1946, Neuerkirch has been part of the then newly founded state of Rhineland-Palatinate.

Since June 1989, the municipality has been running the Kulturhistorisches Museum (Museum of Cultural History). The museum is based on the Hunsrückmuseum’s collection in Simmern. After a three-year preparation phase it was opened to the public. The museum's goal is to document farming equipment and machines, old handicraft occupations along with their tools and village life as it was in days of yore. The museum underwent a considerable expansion owing to many Hunsrück inhabitants’ willingness to make certain objects relating to historical village culture available to the museum to be put on display. The dwelling and commercial buildings in which the museum is housed belong to the municipality of Neuerkirch.

== Politics ==
=== Municipal council ===
The council is made up of 6 council members, who were elected by majority vote at the municipal election held on 7 June 2009, and the honorary mayor as chairman.

=== Mayor ===
Neuerkirch's mayor is Volker Wichter.

=== Coat of arms ===
The municipality's arms might in English heraldic language be described thus: Per pale sable a lion rampant sinister Or armed, langued and crowned gules and Or a bend sinister wavy, the top abased and the bottom enhanced, between a church, the tower to sinister, and a hammer and sledge per saltire, all azure.

In 1979, municipal council decided to introduce a municipal coat of arms. The charge on the dexter (armsbearer's right, viewer's left) side refers to Neuerkirch's former allegiance to the Duchy of Zweibrücken (at least in the case of the Neuerkirch “on that side”, which was part of the Amt of Kastellaun). The “bend sinister wavy” (wavy slanted stripe) stands for the Külzbach, the local brook that once marked the boundary between the two Neuerkirchs, the one “on this side” and the one “on that side”. The church is a canting charge, referring to the last syllable in the municipality's name (“church” in German is Kirche, but this often appears without the last vowel in placenames). The crossed mining tools refer to the silver smelter on the municipal limit.

== Culture and sightseeing ==
=== Buildings ===
The following are listed buildings or sites in Rhineland-Palatinate’s Directory of Cultural Monuments:

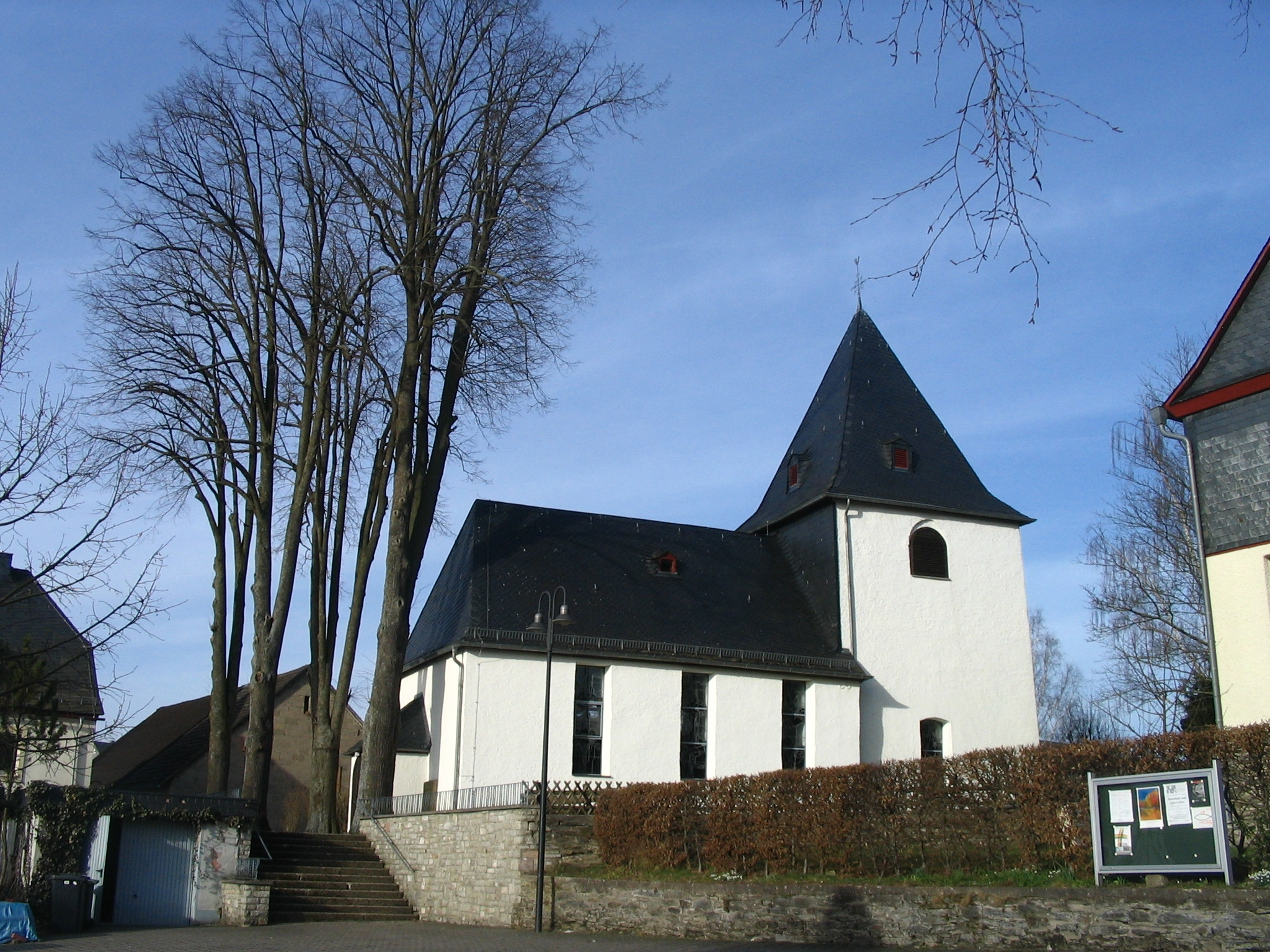
Hauptstraße 2: Evangelical church

- Evangelical church, Hauptstraße 2 – aisleless church, shortly after 1728, conversion after 1821; whole complex of buildings with graveyard
- Alterkülzer Straße 2, 2a – timber-frame house, partly solid or slated, 19th century, stable-barn wing, marked 1738; whole complex of buildings
- Alterkülzer Straße 7 – L-shaped estate, whole complex of buildings; timber-frame house, earlier half of the 18th century; former barn, 19th century
- Hauptstraße 8 – bakehouse and municipal building; timber-frame building, partly solid, 1930s
- Hauptstraße 5, 6, 6a, “Hauptstraße” (monumental zone) – three characteristic timber-frame buildings in the village centre: no. 5 timber-frame Quereinhaus (a combination residential and commercial house divided for these two purposes down the middle, perpendicularly to the street) with knee wall, early 19th century; no. 6 former timber-frame barn, 19th century; no. 6a former barn (now museum); timber-frame building, partly solid or slated, 19th or 20th century
- Külzbachstraße 6 – estate complex, whole complex of buildings, about 1910; building with half-hipped roof
- Laubacher Straße 3 – former Quereinhaus, timber-frame, 19th century

=== Regular events ===
On the second Sunday in July, the traditional artistic craftsman's and farmer's market is held in the historic village centre. In the museum and on the square outside the sponsorship association, together with partner organizations, sees to it that there is a variety of cultural offerings with, among other things, the Oldtimer-Show and the Open-Air-Kino (cinema).

== Economy and infrastructure ==
Until the 19th century, Neuerkirch's livelihood was characterized by ore, zinc, iron and silver mining, among others, as well as the processing of these metals, although the actual mining and smelting took place within neighbouring Alterkülz’s limits. Still remaining from the old Grube Eid mine are tailing heaps, a charge in the municipal arms and a few unique articles now in the local museum.

Neuerkirch lies on the old Hunsrückbahn (railway) right-of-way; the railway formerly linked Simmern and Boppard. The local railway station was Külz, which stood at the municipal boundary with Külz; it has now been torn down. The right-of-way is now part of the Schinderhannes-Radweg (cycle path), which is heavily used, notably by visitors to the area.

The once dominant industry of agriculture has all but disappeared. Remaining today is only one full-time farming operation, while there are also several worked as a sideline.

Jobs in the village are furnished by a carpentry and crane business, a metal construction business, a construction firm, a farmer's kitchen, a carpentry shop, a fabric shop, an insurance agency, an architectural office and a veterinary practice. All other workers commute to jobs elsewhere.

In planning at the moment by the municipality in collaboration with the project development firm juwi is a wind farm with up to ten Enercon type E-82 wind turbines on the rise northeast of Neuerkirch.

The municipality of Neuerkirch, in collaboration with four other municipalities, runs a kindergarten located in neighbouring Alterkülz.
