= Belgweiler =

- Municipality
- Coat of arms

- Location of Belgweiler within Rhein-Hunsrück-Kreis district
- Interactive map of Belgweiler
- Location within Germany Location within Rhineland-Palatinate
- Coordinates: 49°56′41.23″N 7°29′11.13″E
- Country: Germany
- State: Rhineland-Palatinate
- District: Rhein-Hunsrück-Kreis
- Municipal assoc.: Simmern-Rheinböllen
- Subdivisions: 2

Government
  - Mayor (2019–24): Herbert Lang

Area
  - Total: 3.39 km^{2} (1.31 sq mi)
- Elevation: 340 m (1,120 ft)

Population (2025-12-31)
  - Total: 182
  - Density: 53.7/km^{2} (139/sq mi)
- Time zone: UTC+01:00 (CET)
  - Summer (DST): UTC+02:00 (CEST)
- Postal codes: 55469
- Dialling codes: 06761
- Vehicle registration: SIM
- Website: www.belgweiler.net

Belgweiler (German pronunciation: [ˈbɛlkvaɪlɐ]) is an Ortsgemeinde – a municipality belonging to a Verbandsgemeinde, a kind of collective municipality – in the Rhein-Hunsrück-Kreis (district) in Rhineland-Palatinate, Germany. It belongs to the Verbandsgemeinde Simmern-Rheinböllen, whose seat is in Simmern.

== Geography ==
=== Location ===
The municipality lies in the Simmerbach valley in the central Hunsrück.

=== Constituent communities ===
Belgweiler has a small outlying hamlet named Wimmersbacherhof.

=== Land use ===
This breaks down in Belgweiler as follows:

- Agriculture – 68.9%
- Forest – 18.8%
- Water – 1.0%
- Residential and transport – 11.2%
- Other – 0.1%

== History ==
In 1285, Belgweiler had its first documentary mention. Beginning in 1794, Belgweiler was under French rule. In 1815, it was assigned to the Kingdom of Prussia at the Congress of Vienna. Since 1946, it has been part of the then newly founded state of Rhineland-Palatinate.

== Politics ==
=== Municipal council ===
The council is made up of 6 council members, who were elected by majority vote at the municipal election held on 7 June 2009, and the honorary mayor as chairman.

=== Mayor ===
Belgweiler's mayor is Herbert Lang.

=== Coat of arms ===
The German blazon reads: In schräg links gestelltem Schild vorne in Schwarz ein rotbewehrter und gezungter wachsender goldener Löwe, hinten in Gold ein von Silber und Rot in zwei Reihen geschachtelter Balken, unten wachsend ein schwarzer Krummstab.

The municipality's arms might in English heraldic language be described thus: Per bend sinister sable a demilion Or armed and langued gules and Or a fess countercompony argent and gules, issuant from base the head of an abbot's staff turned to sinister of the first.

The charge on the dexter (armsbearer's right, viewer's left) side, the Palatine lion, refers to the former landholders, the Dukes of Palatinate-Simmern and the Elector of the Palatinate. The countercompony (that is, with a two-row chequered pattern) fess refers to the Counts of the “Hinder” County of Sponheim, who owned the outlying Ortsteil of Wimmersbacherhof. The abbot's staff refers to another landholder, who held two estates in the village, the Ravengiersburg Monastery.

== Culture and sightseeing ==
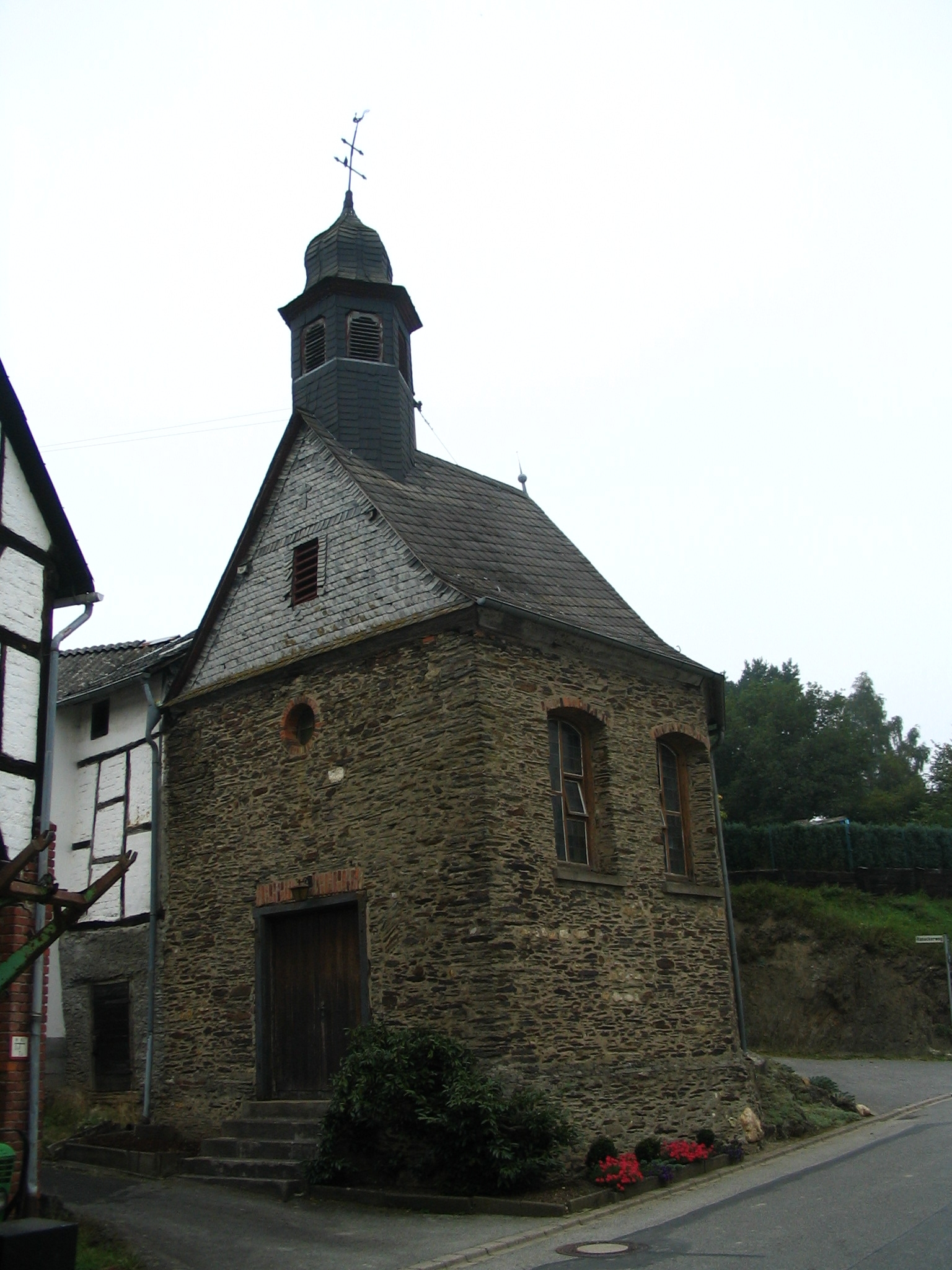
Hauptstraße: Katholische Kapelle St. Anna

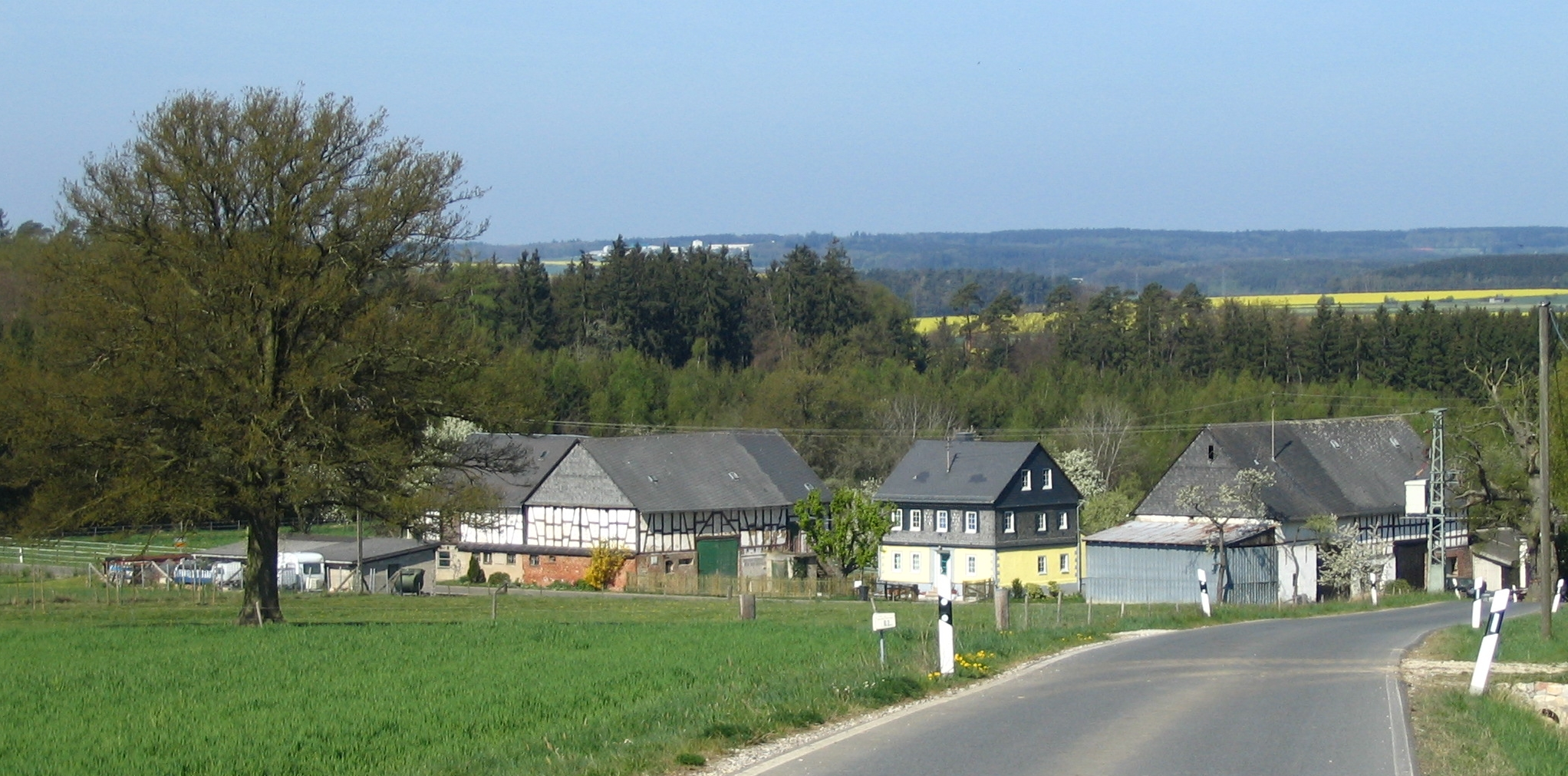
Wimmersbacher Hof

=== Buildings ===
The following are listed buildings or sites in Rhineland-Palatinate’s Directory of Cultural Monuments:

- Saint Anne’s Catholic Chapel (Kapelle St. Anna), Hauptstraße – small aisleless church, earlier half of the 18th century
- Hauptstraße – cast-iron fountain basin, from Stromberg ironworks, marked 1884
- Hauptstraße 8 – estate complex along the street; timber-frame house, commercial wing, marked 1872
- Hauptstraße 15 – Quereinhaus (a combination residential and commercial house divided for these two purposes down the middle, perpendicularly to the street), timber framing plastered, 19th century
- Mühlenweg 3 – former mill; timber-frame house, half-hipped roof, 18th century
- Wimmersbacher Hof 1 – timber-frame house, partly solid or slated, latter half of the 19th century, barn, partly timber-frame; whole complex of buildings
