= Oppertshausen =

- Municipality
- Coat of arms

- Location of Oppertshausen within Rhein-Hunsrück-Kreis district
- Interactive map of Oppertshausen
- Location within Germany Location within Rhineland-Palatinate
- Coordinates: 49°56′55″N 7°28′28″E
- Country: Germany
- State: Rhineland-Palatinate
- District: Rhein-Hunsrück-Kreis
- Municipal assoc.: Simmern-Rheinböllen

Government
  - Mayor (2019–24): Peter Konrad

Area
  - Total: 1.52 km^{2} (0.59 sq mi)
- Elevation: 360 m (1,180 ft)

Population (2025-12-31)
  - Total: 123
  - Density: 80.9/km^{2} (210/sq mi)
- Time zone: UTC+01:00 (CET)
  - Summer (DST): UTC+02:00 (CEST)
- Postal codes: 55469
- Dialling codes: 06761
- Vehicle registration: SIM

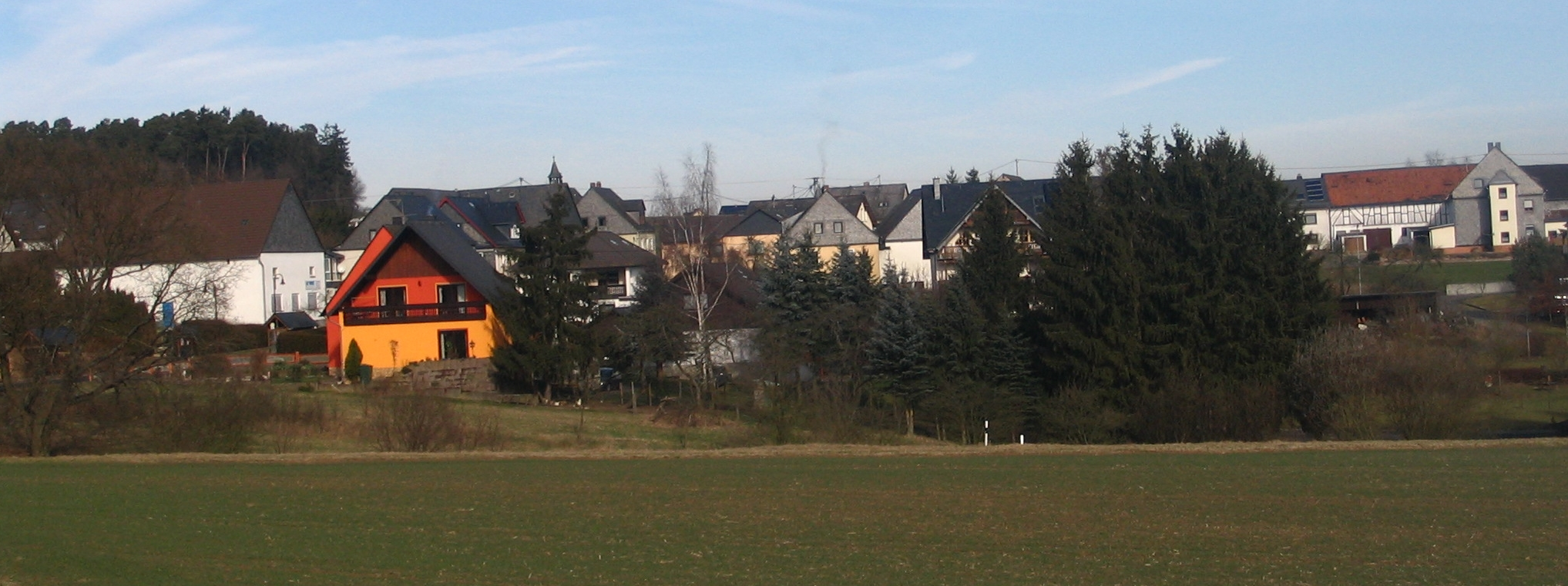
View from the south

Oppertshausen is an Ortsgemeinde – a municipality belonging to a Verbandsgemeinde, a kind of collective municipality – in the Rhein-Hunsrück-Kreis (district) in Rhineland-Palatinate, Germany. It belongs to the Verbandsgemeinde Simmern-Rheinböllen, whose seat is in Simmern.

== Geography ==
=== Location ===
The municipality, a rural residential community, lies in the central Hunsrück in a gently sloping location at the Simmerbach valley. To the east lies the town of Simmern. and to the west lies the Kauerbach valley.

== History ==
Archaeological finds show that the area was settled in the New Stone Age, or in the time of the Hunsrück-Eifel Culture. In 1285, Oppertshausen had its first documentary mention. The village belonged to the Duchy of Palatinate-Simmern, which introduced the Reformation in 1556. Later, the Elector of the Palatinate was the landholder. Beginning in 1794, Oppertshausen lay under French rule. In 1814 it was assigned to the Kingdom of Prussia at the Congress of Vienna. Since 1946, it has been part of the then newly founded state of Rhineland-Palatinate.

== Politics ==
=== Municipal council ===
The council is made up of 6 council members, who were elected by majority vote at the municipal election held on 7 June 2009, and the honorary mayor as chairman.

=== Mayor ===
Oppertshausen's mayor is Peter Konrad.
