= Benzweiler =

- Municipality
- Location of Benzweiler within Rhein-Hunsrück-Kreis district
- Interactive map of Benzweiler
- Location within Germany Location within Rhineland-Palatinate
- Coordinates: 50°1′16.3″N 7°36′17.95″E
- Country: Germany
- State: Rhineland-Palatinate
- District: Rhein-Hunsrück-Kreis
- Municipal assoc.: Simmern-Rheinböllen

Government
  - Mayor (2019–24): Hans-Joachim Kunz

Area
  - Total: 3.19 km^{2} (1.23 sq mi)
- Elevation: 389 m (1,276 ft)

Population (2025-12-31)
  - Total: 209
  - Density: 65.5/km^{2} (170/sq mi)
- Time zone: UTC+01:00 (CET)
  - Summer (DST): UTC+02:00 (CEST)
- Postal codes: 55494
- Dialling codes: 06766
- Vehicle registration: SIM
- Website: www.benzweiler.de

Benzweiler (German pronunciation: [ˈbɛntsvaɪlɐ]) is an Ortsgemeinde – a municipality belonging to a Verbandsgemeinde, a kind of collective municipality – in the Rhein-Hunsrück-Kreis (district) in Rhineland-Palatinate, Germany. It belongs to the Verbandsgemeinde Simmern-Rheinböllen, whose seat is in Simmern. Benzweiler is a tourism municipality (Fremdenverkehrsgemeinde).

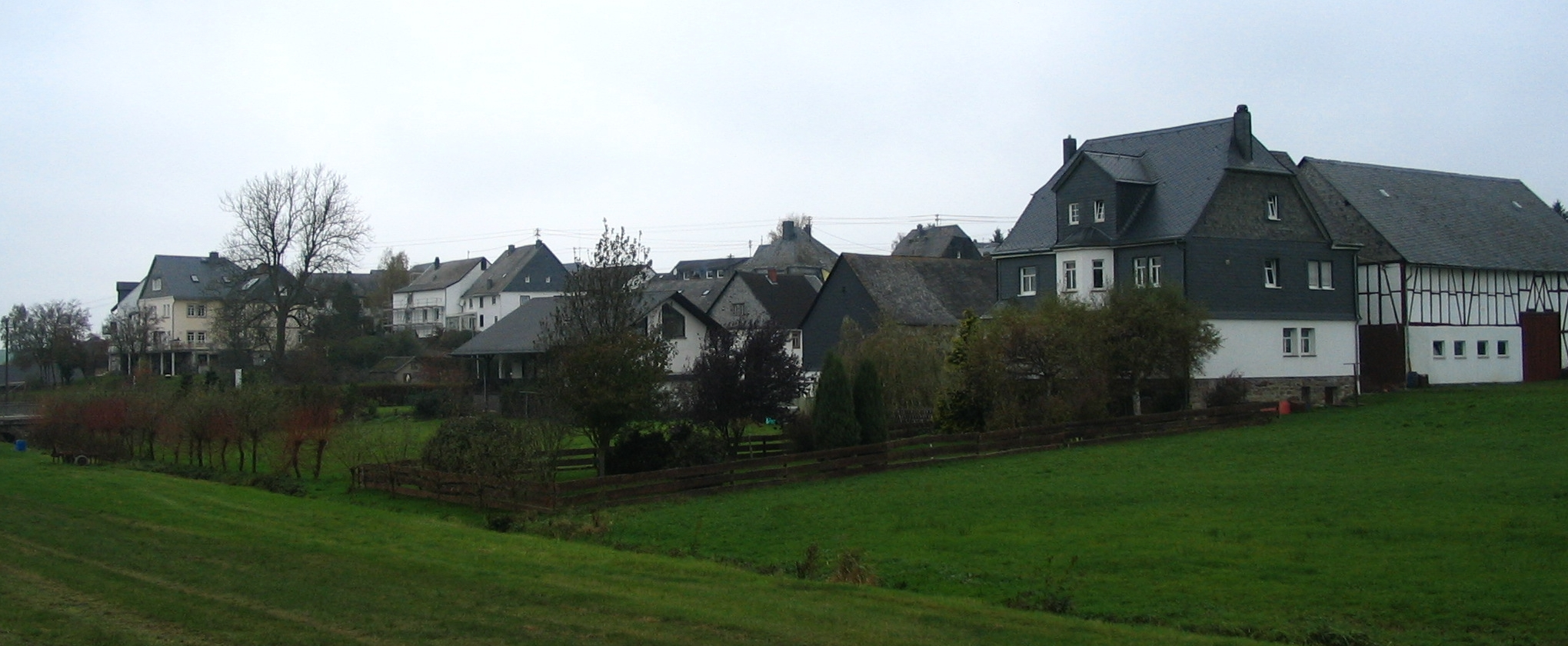
Benzweiler seen from the southeast

== Geography ==
=== Location ===
The municipality lies in the Hunsrück.

== History ==
Six barrows northeast of the village make it plain that Celts settled here in antiquity. Beginning in 1794, Benzweiler lay under French rule. In 1815 it was assigned to the Kingdom of Prussia at the Congress of Vienna. Since 1946, it has been part of the then newly founded state of Rhineland-Palatinate.

=== Population development ===
These are population figures for Benzweiler (for 31 December each time):

Historical population

Year	Pop.	±%
1815	126	—
1835	178	+41.3%
1871	193	+8.4%
1905	194	+0.5%
1939	169	−12.9%
1950	178	+5.3%

Year	Pop.	±%
1961	156	−12.4%
1965	159	+1.9%
1970	168	+5.7%
1975	162	−3.6%
1980	169	+4.3%
1985	164	−3.0%

Year	Pop.	±%
1987	176	+7.3%
1990	187	+6.2%
1995	201	+7.5%
2000	213	+6.0%
2005	209	−1.9%
2009	213	+1.9%

Source: Statistisches Landesamt Rheinland-Pfalz

== Politics ==
=== Municipal council ===
The council is made up of 6 council members, who were elected at the municipal election held on 7 June 2009, and the honorary mayor as chairman.

=== Mayor ===
Benzweiler's mayor is Hans-Joachim Kunz.

== Culture and sightseeing ==
=== Buildings ===
The following are listed buildings or sites in Rhineland-Palatinate’s Directory of Cultural Monuments:

- Hauptstraße 4 – building with half-hipped roof, partly timber framing sided, about 1820
