= Niederkumbd =

- Municipality
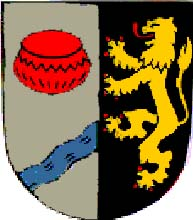
- Coat of arms

- Location of Niederkumbd within Rhein-Hunsrück-Kreis district
- Interactive map of Niederkumbd
- Location within Germany Location within Rhineland-Palatinate
- Coordinates: 50°0′52″N 7°32′10″E
- Country: Germany
- State: Rhineland-Palatinate
- District: Rhein-Hunsrück-Kreis
- Municipal assoc.: Simmern-Rheinböllen

Government
  - Mayor (2019–24): Ralf Auler

Area
  - Total: 2.27 km^{2} (0.88 sq mi)
- Elevation: 404 m (1,325 ft)

Population (2025-12-31)
  - Total: 326
  - Density: 144/km^{2} (372/sq mi)
- Time zone: UTC+01:00 (CET)
  - Summer (DST): UTC+02:00 (CEST)
- Postal codes: 55469
- Dialling codes: 06761
- Vehicle registration: SIM
- Website: www.niederkumbd.de

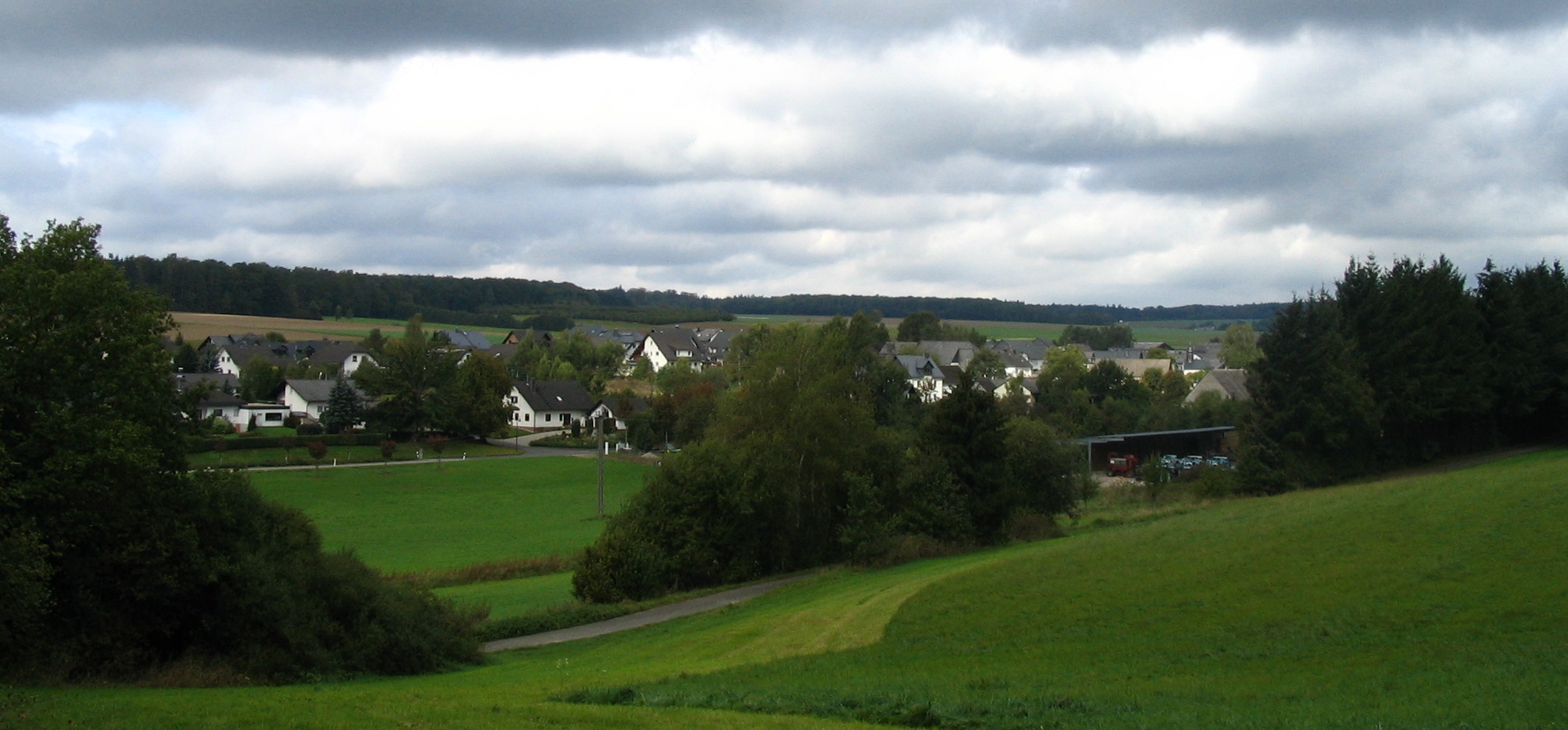
Niederkumbd seen from the southeast

Niederkumbd (until 1936 Niederchumbd) is an Ortsgemeinde – a municipality belonging to a Verbandsgemeinde, a kind of collective municipality – in the Rhein-Hunsrück-Kreis (district) in Rhineland-Palatinate, Germany. It belongs to the Verbandsgemeinde Simmern-Rheinböllen, whose seat is in Simmern.

== Geography ==
=== Location ===
The municipality lies in the Hunsrück, roughly 4 km north of Simmern, and is characterized by agriculture. The municipal area measures 2.27 km².

== History ==
In 1310, Niederkumbd had its first documentary mention. At that time, the village was called Hasencomede and was closely tied to the Cistercian convent at Klosterkumbd. In the Middle Ages, there was a local noble family that bore the same name. Disagreements between the County of Sponheim and the Elector of the Palatinate led in 1368 to a feud around Niederkumbd. Thereafter, the Count of Sponheim had to acknowledge Comital Palatine authority over the village. Beginning in 1410, Niederkumbd belonged to the Duchy of Simmern, which introduced the Reformation in 1556. Later, the Count Palatine of the Rhine became the landholder once again. Beginning in 1794, Niederkumbd lay under French rule. In 1814 it was assigned to the Kingdom of Prussia at the Congress of Vienna. Since 1946, it has been part of the then newly founded state of Rhineland-Palatinate.

== Politics ==
=== Municipal council ===
The council is made up of 8 council members, who were elected by majority vote at the municipal election held on 7 June 2009, and the honorary mayor as chairman.

=== Mayor ===
Niederkumbd’s mayor is Ralf Auler.

=== Coat of arms ===
The municipality’s arms might be described thus: Per pale argent an urn gules above a bend sinister wavy abased, the end in base enhanced, azure, and sable a lion rampant Or armed and langued of the second.

== Culture and sightseeing ==
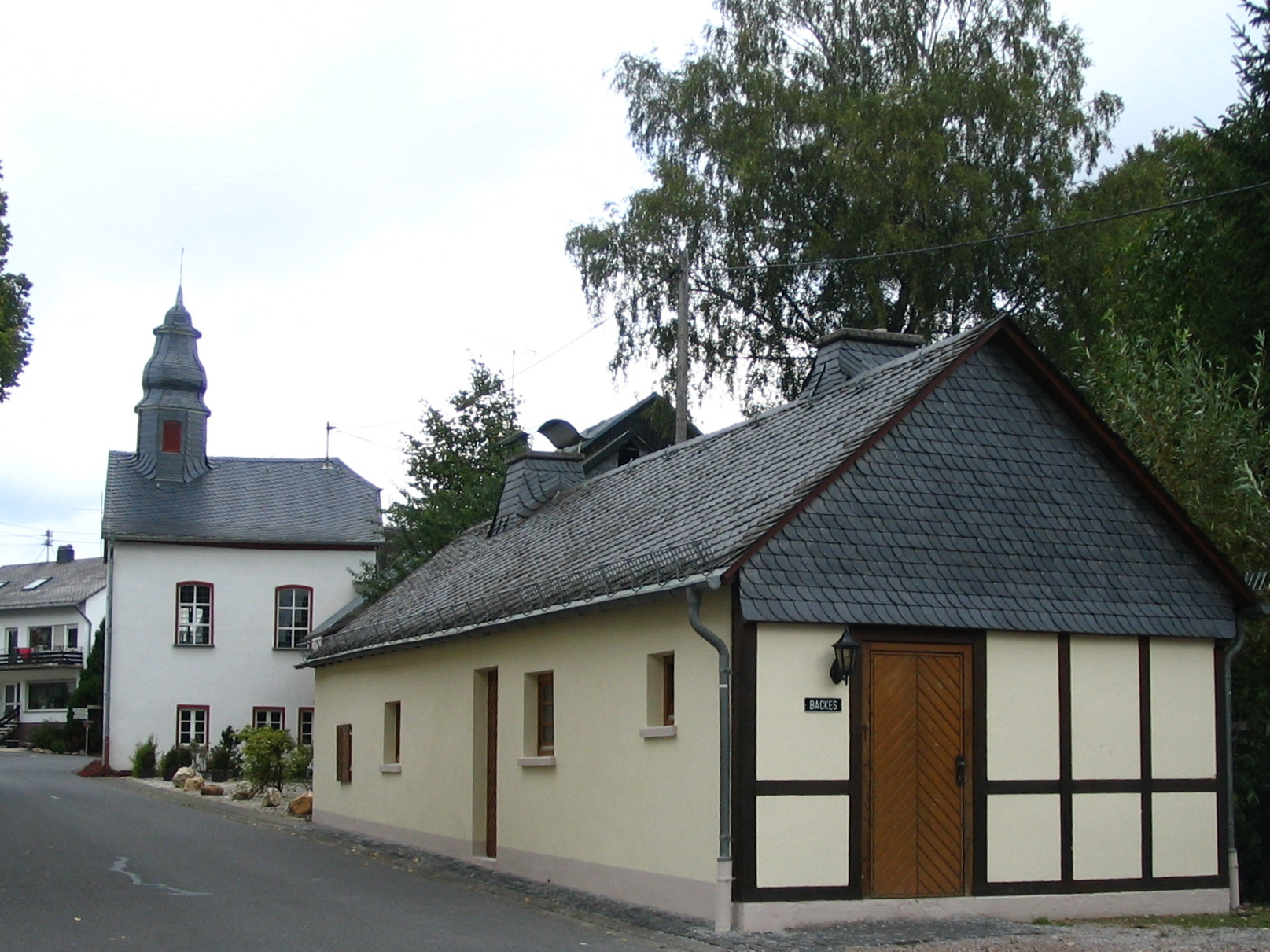
Simmerner Straße: old bakehouse and Evangelical chapel

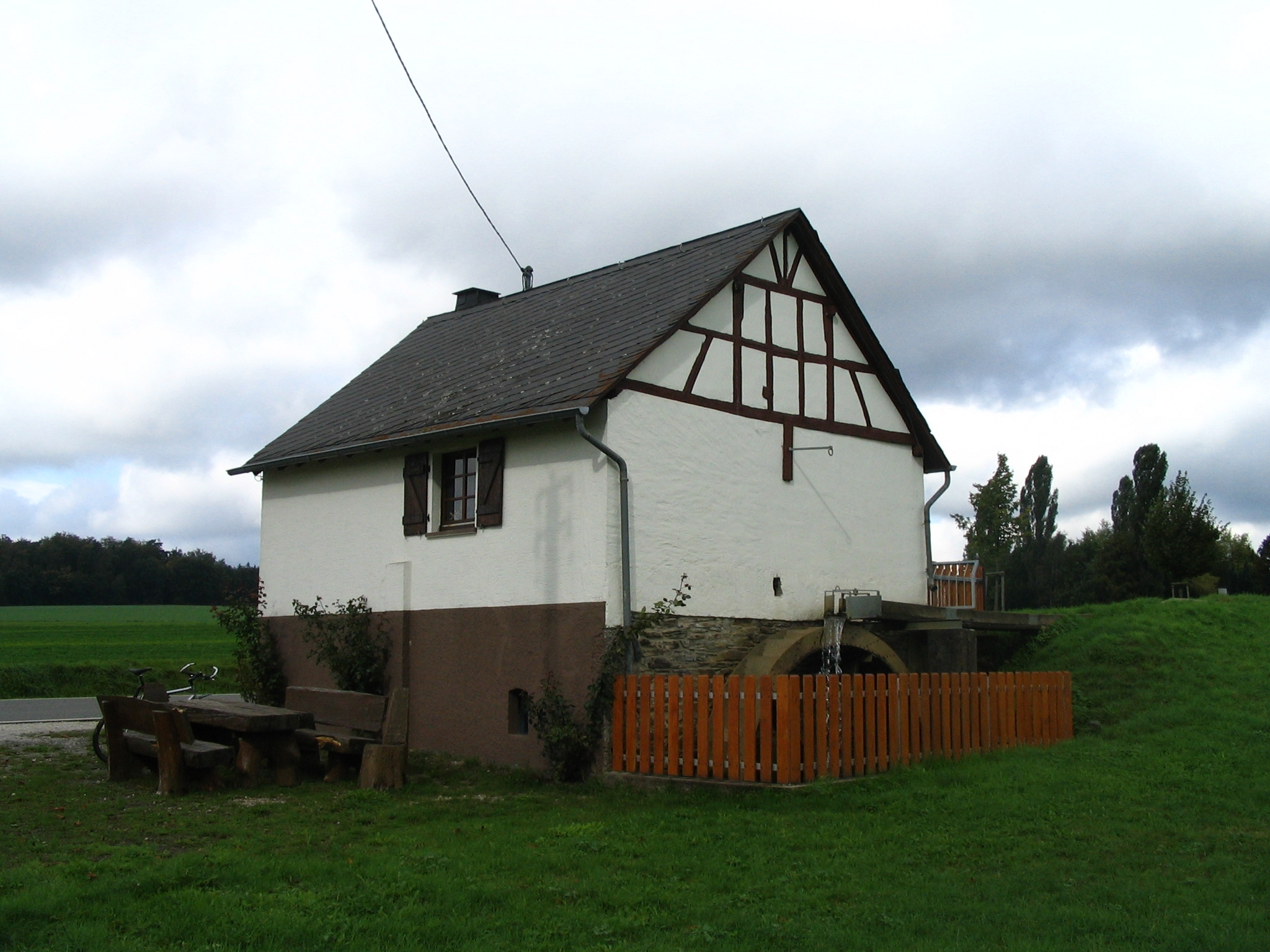
Historic watermill, built in 1848 by Peter Paul Auler and associates

=== Buildings ===
The following are listed buildings or sites in Rhineland-Palatinate’s Directory of Cultural Monuments:

- Simmerner Straße – fountain; cast-iron basin with relief, cast-iron pump, Stromberg New Ironworks, marked 1887
- Simmerner Straße 24 – old bakehouse, one-floor plastered building, 19th century
- Simmerner Straße 28, Evangelical chapel – timber-frame building, partly solid, 1807-1812

==== Other sites ====
Niederkumbd also has an historic watermill from 1848.
