= Klosterkumbd =

Municipality in Rhineland-Palatinate, Germany

- Municipality
- Coat of arms

- Location of Klosterkumbd within Rhein-Hunsrück-Kreis district
- Interactive map of Klosterkumbd
- Location within Germany Location within Rhineland-Palatinate
- Coordinates: 50°1′43″N 7°32′9″E
- Country: Germany
- State: Rhineland-Palatinate
- District: Rhein-Hunsrück-Kreis
- Municipal assoc.: Simmern-Rheinböllen

Government
  - Mayor (2019–24): Klaus Nick

Area
  - Total: 7.33 km^{2} (2.83 sq mi)
- Elevation: 403 m (1,322 ft)

Population (2025-12-31)
  - Total: 268
  - Density: 36.6/km^{2} (94.7/sq mi)
- Time zone: UTC+01:00 (CET)
  - Summer (DST): UTC+02:00 (CEST)
- Postal codes: 55469
- Dialling codes: 06761
- Vehicle registration: SIM
- Website: www.klosterkumbd.de

Klosterkumbd is an Ortsgemeinde – a municipality belonging to a Verbandsgemeinde, a kind of collective municipality – in the Rhein-Hunsrück-Kreis (district) in Rhineland-Palatinate, Germany. It belongs to the Verbandsgemeinde Simmern-Rheinböllen, whose seat is in Simmern.

== Geography ==
=== Location ===
The municipality lies in the Hunsrück, in the valley of the Kumbdbach, 6 km north of the district seat of Simmern.

== History ==
Sometime between 1011 and 1018, Archbishop of Mainz Erkambald confirmed baptism and burial rights for the chapel at Klosterkumbd. In 1180, the pious Eberhard von Kumbd (also called Eberhard de Commeda, the last word being a Latinized form of “Kumbd”) built a hermitage on a plot that was a gift from the Lords of Dyck and led a hermit's life there. Only three years later, though, he had company after he founded a Cistercian convent at Kumbd with Heinrich von Dyck's support, and on a plot hitherto owned by him. This institution shaped Kumbd's history and even gave the village its current name: “Kumbd Convent” is Kloster Kumbd in German, now written as one word, “Klosterkumbd”. In 1196, the convent's founding was confirmed by Archbishop of Mainz Conrad of Wittelsbach. Landholders through the village's history were the knightly family von Treis in the 13th century and the Lords of Reifenberg and Schönenberg about 1440. In 1420, Bertram Vogt von Vilwel and his wife Elsa von Reifenberg sold Count Palatine Stephan their one-half share in the Kumbd court. Later the same year, Eberhard von Schönenberg also transferred his one-half share to the Count Palatine. In 1566, Count Palatine Georg von Simmern dissolved the Cistercian convent and subjected it to secular jurisdiction. The nuns remained at the convent, however, living according to the dictates of their order, until the last abbess died in 1574. In 1599 there were nine estate complexes at Klosterkumbd. In 1673, the village passed to Electoral Palatinate. In 1787 the convent woodlands comprised 307 Morgen and the municipal woodlands 50. Beginning in 1794, Klosterkumbd lay under French rule. In 1815 it was assigned to the Kingdom of Prussia at the Congress of Vienna. Since 1946, it has been part of the then newly founded state of Rhineland-Palatinate.

== Politics ==
=== Municipal council ===
The council is made up of 6 council members, who were elected by majority vote at the municipal election held on 7 June 2009, and the honorary mayor as chairman.

=== Mayor ===
Klosterkumbd's mayor is Klaus Nick.

=== Coat of arms ===
The municipality's arms might be described thus: Sable a lion rampant with tail forked flory Or armed, langued and crowned gules holding in his dexter paw a curved sword of the second, and issuant from base dexter an abbess's staff of the second.

== Culture and sightseeing ==
=== Buildings ===
The following are listed buildings or sites in Rhineland-Palatinate’s Directory of Cultural Monuments:

- Hauptstraße 7 – timber-frame Quereinhaus (a combination residential and commercial house divided for these two purposes down the middle, perpendicularly to the street), partly slated, 19th century; whole complex of buildings with side buildings
- Im Eck – fountain; cast-iron basin, hand pump, Rheinböllen Ironworks, latter half of the 19th century
- Mühlenweg 4 – Quereinhaus, timber framing with K-shaped frames, early 19th century
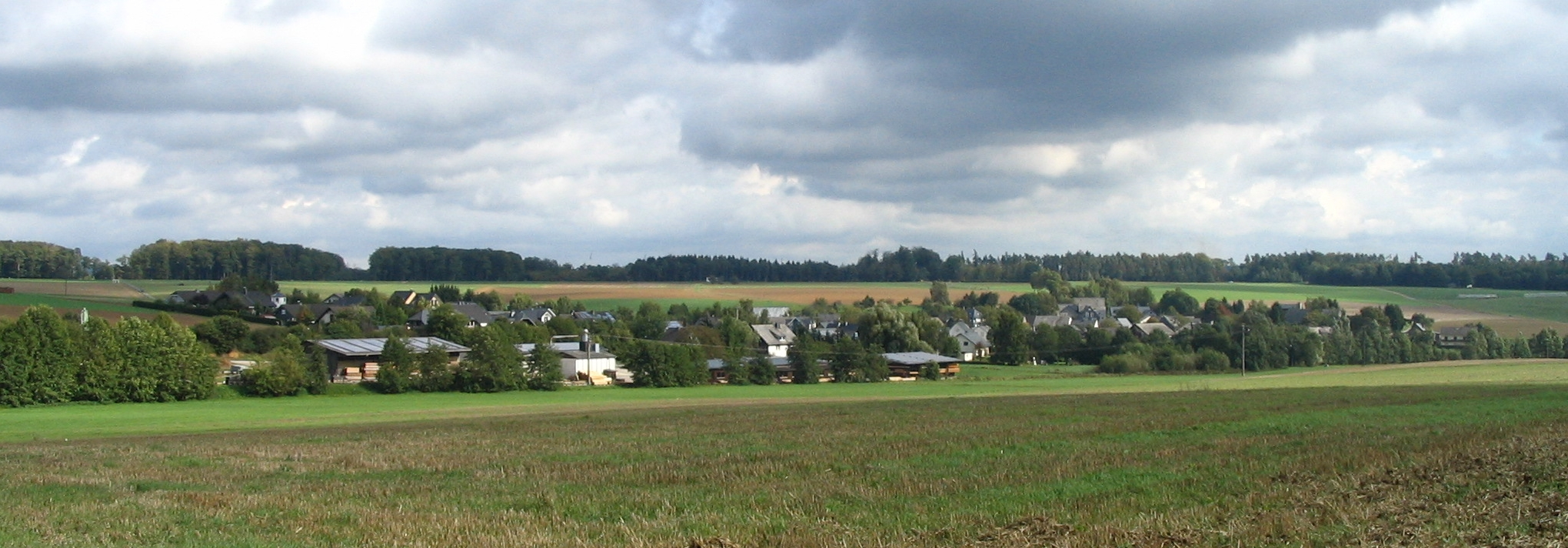
Klosterkumbd from the southwest

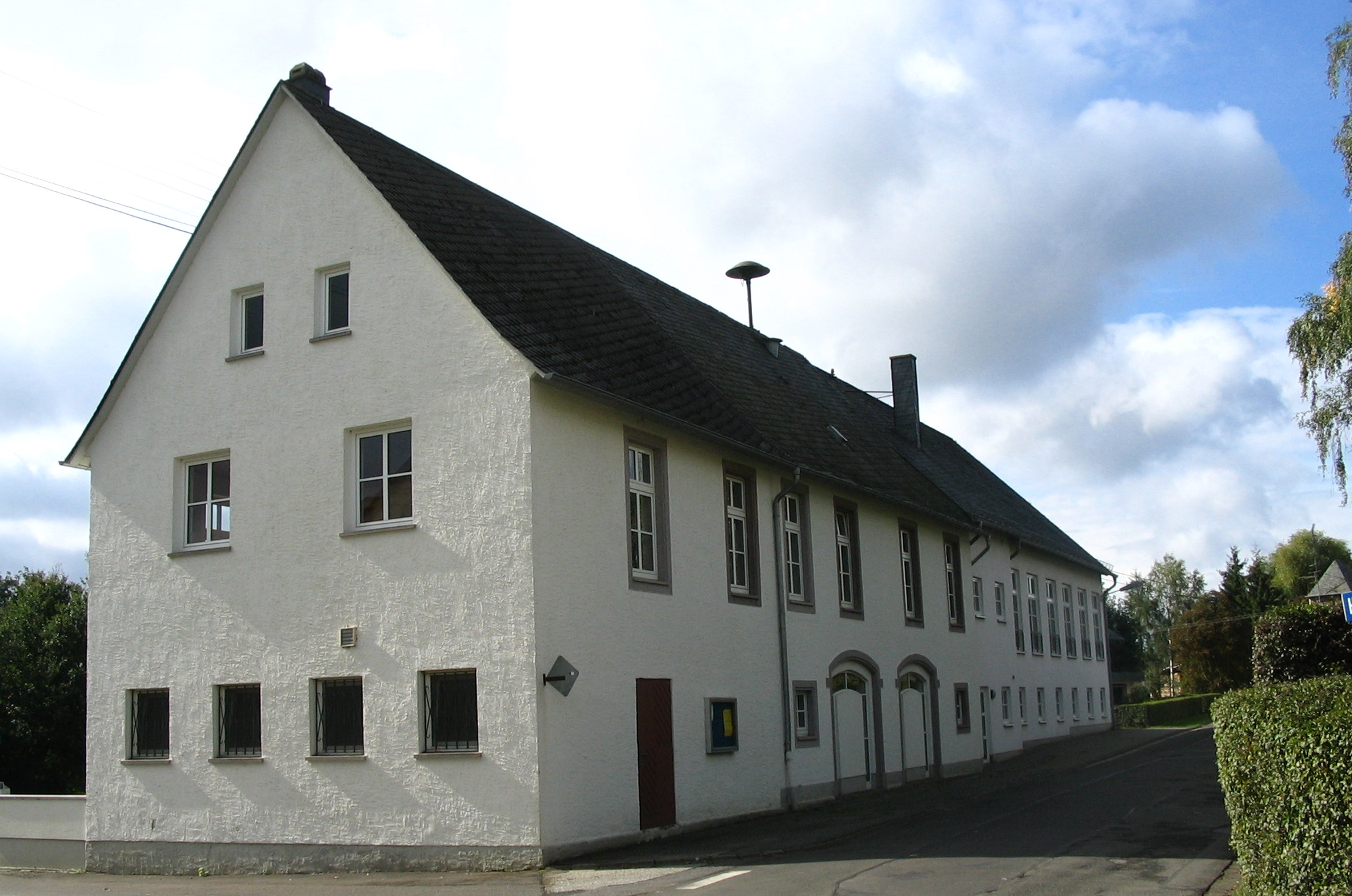
Modern community centre

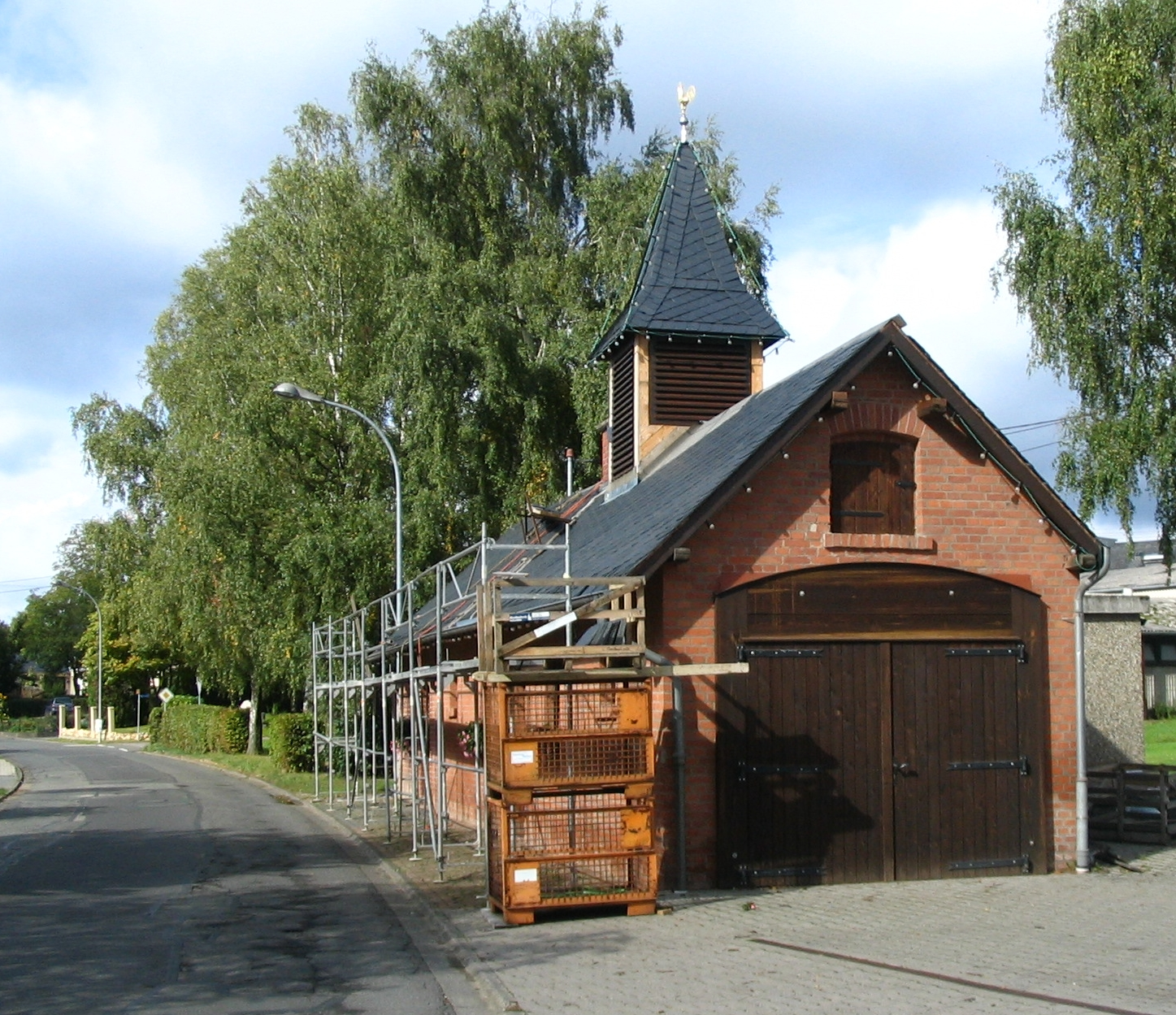
Historical bakehouse
