= Ohlweiler =

- Municipality
- Coat of arms

- Location of Ohlweiler within Rhein-Hunsrück-Kreis district
- Interactive map of Ohlweiler
- Location within Germany Location within Rhineland-Palatinate
- Coordinates: 49°57′58″N 7°29′55″E
- Country: Germany
- State: Rhineland-Palatinate
- District: Rhein-Hunsrück-Kreis
- Municipal assoc.: Simmern-Rheinböllen

Government
  - Mayor (2019–24): Jenny Apelt

Area
  - Total: 3.91 km^{2} (1.51 sq mi)
- Elevation: 320 m (1,050 ft)

Population (2025-12-31)
  - Total: 333
  - Density: 85.2/km^{2} (221/sq mi)
- Time zone: UTC+01:00 (CET)
  - Summer (DST): UTC+02:00 (CEST)
- Postal codes: 55469
- Dialling codes: 06761
- Vehicle registration: SIM

Ohlweiler is an Ortsgemeinde – a municipality belonging to a Verbandsgemeinde, a kind of collective municipality – in the Rhein-Hunsrück-Kreis (district) in Rhineland-Palatinate, Germany. It belongs to the Verbandsgemeinde Simmern-Rheinböllen, whose seat is in Simmern.

== Geography ==
=== Location ===
The municipality, a rural residential community, lies in the central Hunsrück in the Simmerbach valley at the mouth of the Holzbach. Ohlweiler lies roughly 3 km southwest of Simmern and 7 km northeast of Kirchberg.

== History ==
In 1310, Ohlweiler had its first documentary mention. The village belonged to the Duchy of Palatinate-Simmern, which introduced the Reformation in 1556. Later, the Elector of the Palatinate was the landholder. Beginning in 1794, Ohlweiler lay under French rule. In 1815 it was assigned to the Kingdom of Prussia at the Congress of Vienna. Since 1946, it has been part of the then newly founded state of Rhineland-Palatinate.

== Politics ==
=== Municipal council ===
The council is made up of 8 council members, who were elected by majority vote at the municipal election held on 7 June 2009, and the honorary mayor as chairman.

=== Mayor ===
Ohlweiler's mayor is Jenny Apelt.

== Culture and sightseeing ==
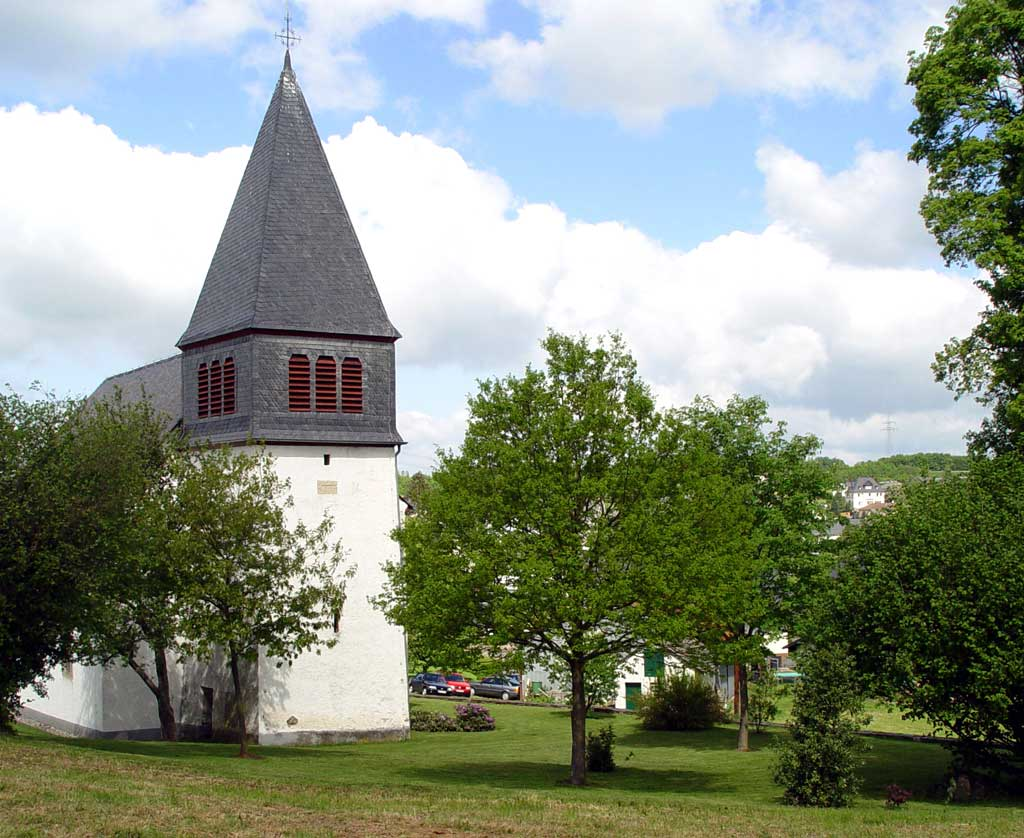
Ohlweiler Evangelical Church

=== Buildings ===
The following are listed buildings or sites in Rhineland-Palatinate’s Directory of Cultural Monuments:

- Evangelical church, Kirchenweg – Classicist aisleless church, 1788, tower partly from the 14th century
- Beside Hauptstraße 17 – bakehouse, one-floor brick building, partly timber-frame, half-hipped roof, late 19th century

== Economy and infrastructure ==
=== Transport ===
Bundesstraße 50 is found on the municipality's outskirts. The Schinderhannes-Radweg (cycle path) runs through the village.
