= Ellerspring =

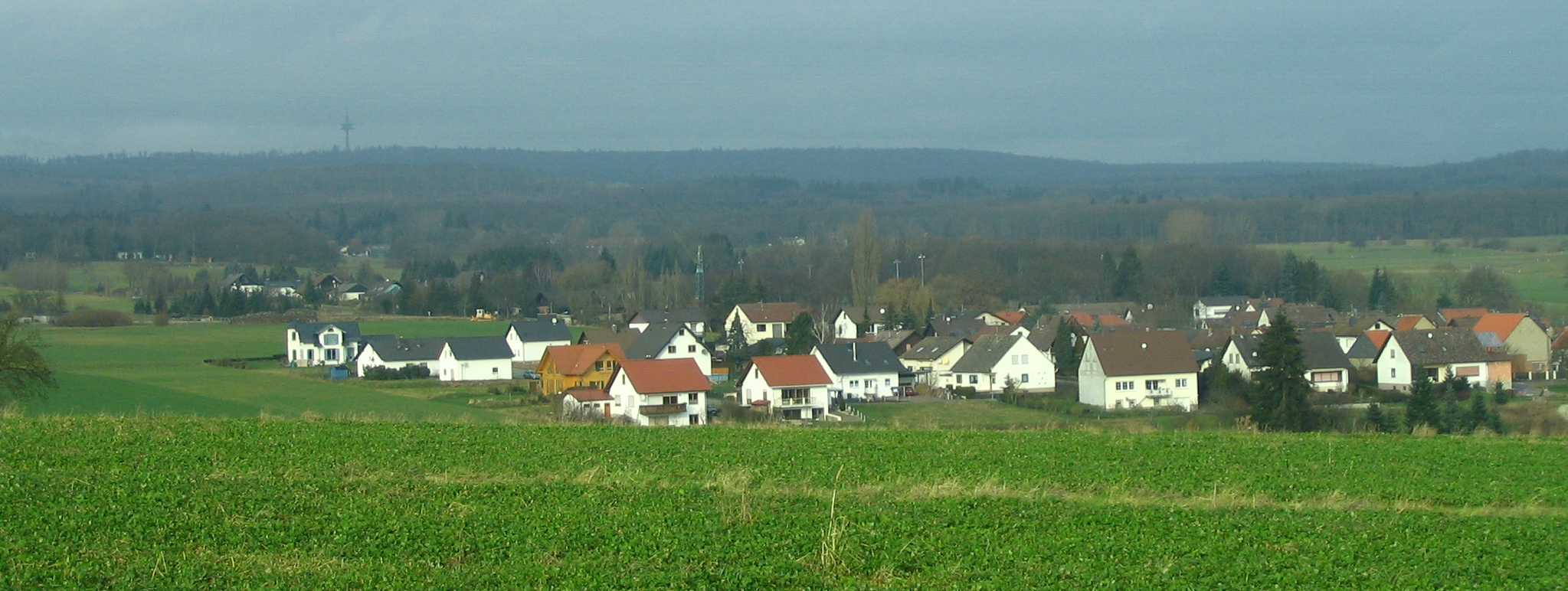
- View over Winterbach to the Ellerspring with its transmission tower

Highest point
- Elevation: 657.5 m above sea level (NHN) (2,157 ft)
- Prominence: 182 m ↓ Rheinböllen
- Isolation: 30.2 km
- Listing: – highest point in the Soonwald – Ellerspring Transmission Tower
- Coordinates: 49°54′47″N 7°36′43″E

Geography
- Location within Rhineland-Palatinate
- Location: near Winterbach; Bad Kreuznach, Rhineland-Palatinate Germany
- Parent range: Soonwald, Hunsrück

Geology
- Rock type: quartzite

The Ellerspring, at 657.5 m above sea level (NHN), is the highest point of the Soonwald, a part of the Hunsrück mountains in the German Central Uplands. It is situated near Winterbach in the county of Bad Kreuznach in the state of Rhineland-Palatinate

== Geography ==
=== Location ===
The Ellerspring lies in the northwest of the county of Bad Kreuznach roughly in the centre of the Soonwald-Nahe Nature Park. It rises within the parish of Winterbach, whose village church stands some 4.6 km south-southeast of the summit. About 1 km to the northwest of the summit in the valley of the Gräfenbach, which initially flows southwest, and that of the Lametbach, which begins by heading northeast, is the boundary with the county of Rhein-Hunsrück-Kreis, in which are located the villages of Argenthal (to the north), Riesweiler and Tiefenbach (to the northwest) and Sargenroth and Mengerschied (to the west). Not far from the mountain, in the county of Bad Kreuznach, lie the villages of Spabrücken and Münchwald (to the east), Gebroth (to the southeast) and Winterbach and Ippenschied (to the south-southeast). About 2 km (as the crow flies) south-southwest of the summit at a height of about 529 m rises the Nahe tributary of Ellerbach, after which the mountain is named. Roughly northeast of the summit is the Ödesborner Höhe (641.1 m) and, beyond that, the Hölzenkopf (604.8 m). Forming a spur to the south-southeastern is the Odstein (511.0 m) and, to the east, the Steineberg (563.9 m).

=== Natural regions ===
The Ellerspring belongs to the natural regional major unit group of Hunsrück (No. 24), in the major unit of Soonwald (240) and the sub-unit of Großer Soon (240.1) to the eponymous natural region of Großer Soon (240.11).
