= Soonwald =

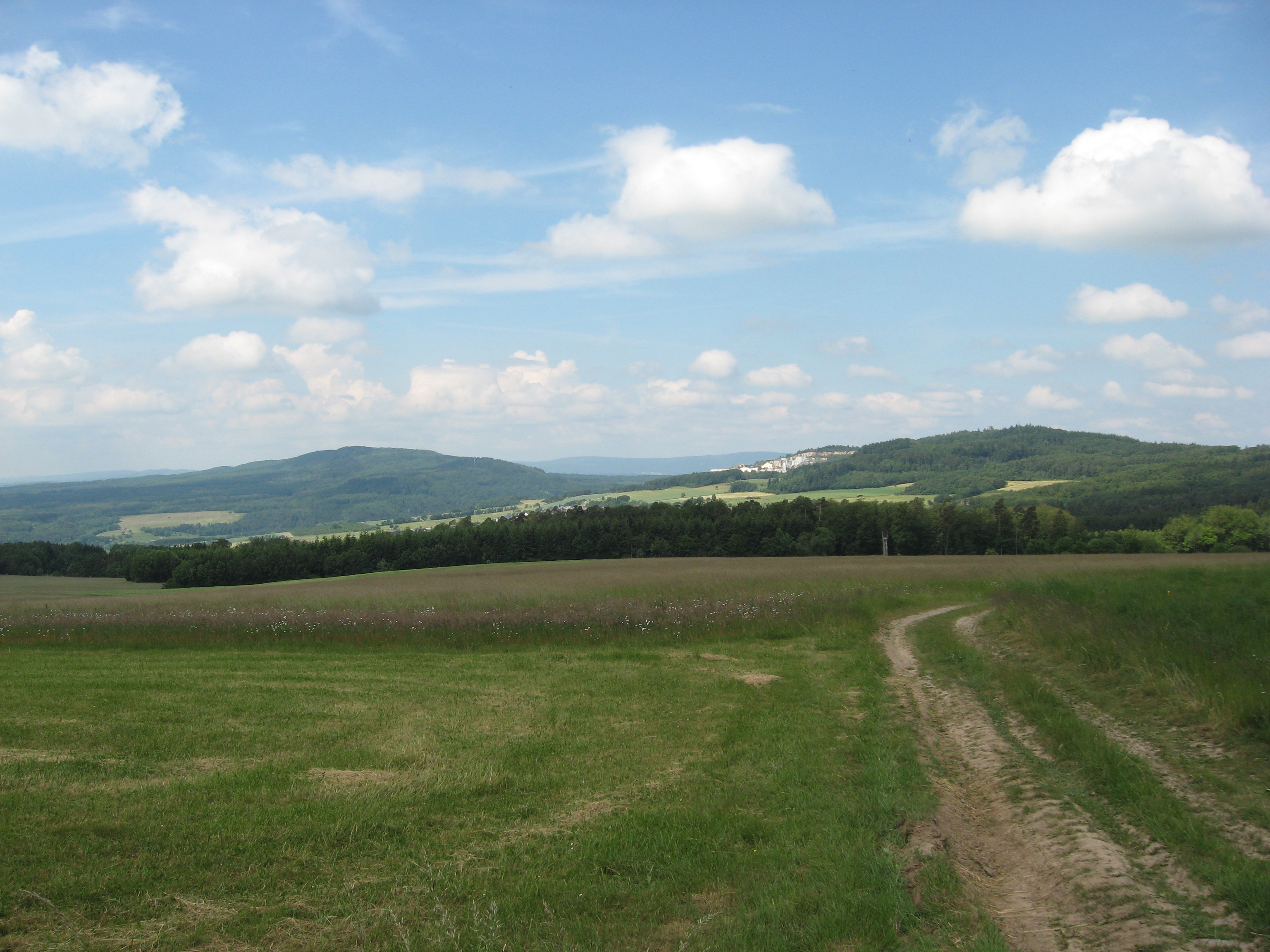
- The Soonwaldsteig trail near Henau in the Soonwald.

Highest point
- Peak: Ellerspring
- Elevation: 657.5 m above NN

Geography
- Location within Rhineland-Palatinate
- State(s): Rhein-Hunsrück-Kreis, Bad Kreuznach; Rhineland-Palatinate, Germany
- Range coordinates: 49°54′48″N 7°36′44″E
- Parent range: Hunsrück

Geology
- Rock type: Quartzite ridge

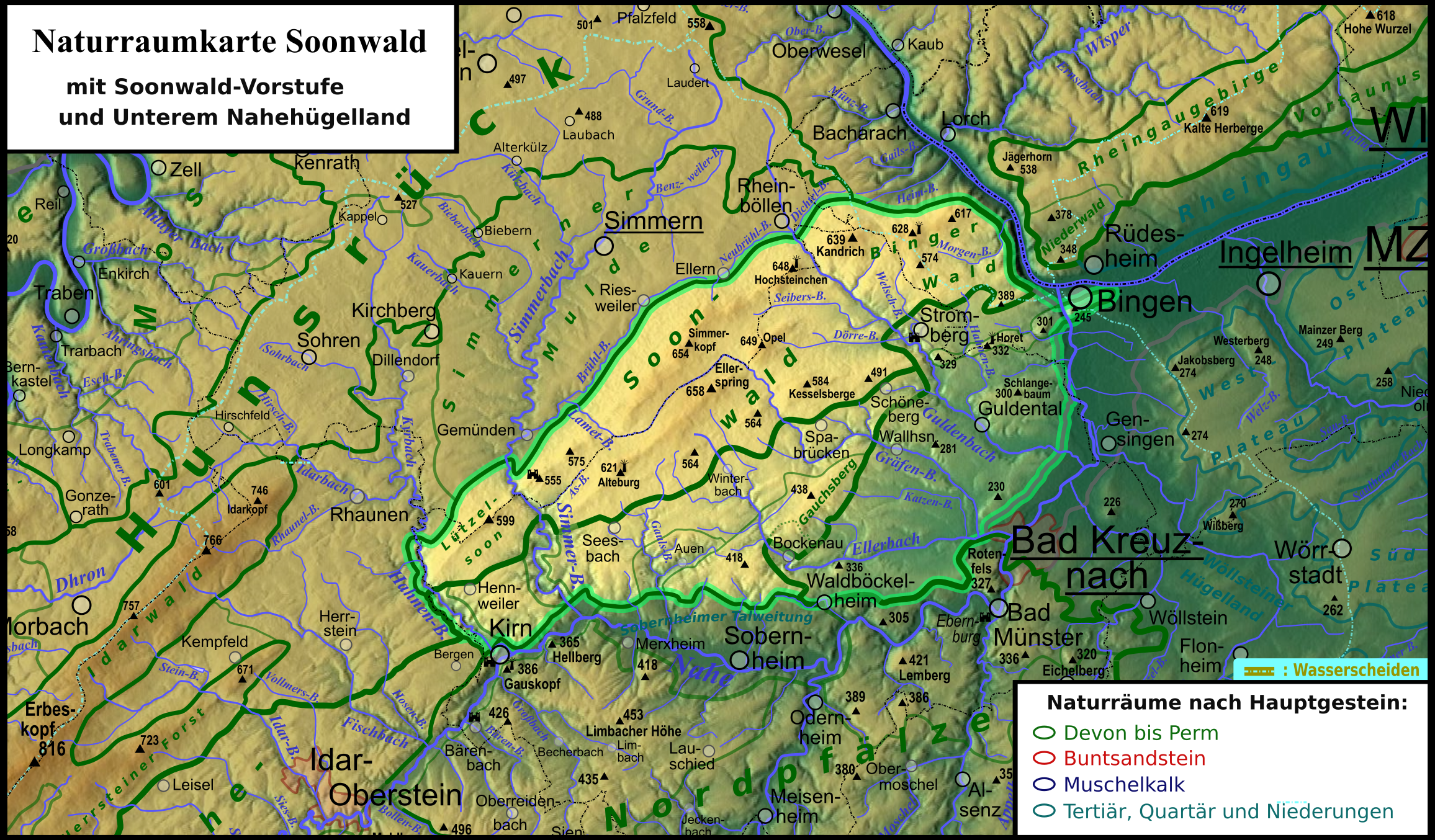
The Soonwald and surrounding area

The Soonwald (German pronunciation: [ˈzoːnʋalt]) is a forested, low mountain region, up to 657.5 m above sea level (NN), which forms part of the Hunsrück mountains in the German Central Uplands. It lies within the counties of Rhein-Hunsrück-Kreis and Bad Kreuznach in the state of Rhineland-Palatinate.

== Geography ==
=== Location ===
The Soonwald lies in the west and south of the county of Rhein-Hunsrück-Kreis and the east and north of Bad Kreuznach county. It is located within the Soonwald-Nahe Nature Park, roughly between the main crest of the Hunsrück mountains (to the northwest) and the Nahe valley (to the southeast), behind which the Saar-Nahe Uplands rise. The Soonwald extends over about 40 kilometres in a southwest to northeast direction from the Simmer valley on the Nahe to the valley of the Guldenbach, which lies on the boundary of the Soonwald with the Bingen Forest, west of the Rhine knee near Bingen.

Other ranges and woodlands of the German Central Uplands adjoin the Soonwald in all directions of the compass: to the southwest are the Lützelsoon and, a just to its west, the Idar Forest; to the southeast is the Gauchswald; and to the northeast, the Bingen Forest. The Lützelsoon and parts of the Bingen Wald are sometimes counted as part of the Soonwald rather than as separate forest regions; the entire region then being known as the "Großer Soon" ("Great Soon").

=== Climate ===
The average annual temperature on the summits of the Soonwald is just under 7 °C, more than 2 °C lower than that in the Simmerbach valley near Kellenbach (over 9 °C), thanks to a height difference of about 500 metres. They also receive around 25% more precipitation (800 mm) than in the valleys.

=== Mountains and hills ===
The highest mountain in the Soonwald is the Ellerspring (657.5 m). By contrast, its lowest point is near Simmertal – if the village still counts as part of the Soonwald – by the confluence of the Simmerbach and the Nahe (190 m). The following mountains and hills belong to the Soonwald, sorted by their height in metres (m) above sea level (NN), unless otherwise indicated (excluding those in the Lützelsoon):

- Ellerspring (657.5 m), between Argenthal and Winterbach
- Simmerkopf (653.75 m), highest mountain in Rhein-Hunsrück-Kreis, east of Tiefenbach
- Opel (ca. 649 m), west of Dörrebach
- Hochsteinchen (648.3 m), south-southeast of Rheinböllen; with observation tower
- Schanzerkopf (643.5 m), south of Ellern
- Katzenkopf (636.5 m), southwest foothill of the Hochsteinchen
- Ochsenbaumer Höhe (ca. 635 m), south-southeast of Argenthal
- Ginsterkopf (ca. 632 m), southeast of Riesweiler
- Wildburghöhe (633.5 m), southeast of Sargenroth; with the ruined castle of Wildburg
- Gemündener Höhe (575.2 m), southeast of Gemünden
- Alteburg (620.5 m), northeast of Schwarzerden; with ramparts and observation tower
- Steineberg (563.9 m), northwest of Münchwald
- Koppensteiner Höhe (554.9 m), north-northwest of Henau; with the ruins of Koppenstein Castle

== History ==
The name Soonwald occurs for the first time in an 868 A.D. document belonging to Prüm Abbey, where it is referred to as the silva sana. Later spellings are: 1128 nemus sane, 1190 waldt San, 1438 off dem Sane, then San and finally Soonwald. Numerous attempts to explain its origin link the word with Senn ("pasture") or Sone ("pig herd") and indicate the centuries-old function of the Soonwald as a grazing forest.

Originally a huge forest extended from Southern Alsace through the Saarland, the Westrich and the Hunsrück up to the Moselle. This was the Vosagus (Wasgau Forest), a silva regis ("royal forest"). Over time, deforestation resulted in this vast forest being divided into smaller ones that, in turn, were given their own names.

Tumuli, such as the Alte Grab south of Argenthal, castle ruins and today's settlements and villages suggest that Soonwald and the surrounding area have been inhabited for a long time.

To secure ore deposits and smelting sites, such as the Gräfenbacherhütte, many castles were built during the Middle Ages along the valleys of streams flowing southwards to the River Nahe. The picturesque ruins of Wildenburg castle and of the Koppenstein on the northern part of the Soonwald ridge became legendary sites in the 19th century thanks to romantic ballads composed by Hunsrück poets, Otto von Vacano and Peter Joseph Rottmann.

When searching for an area in the Hunsrück in which to create a National Park, the state's Environment Ministry saw the Soonwald region as an option, alongside the Schwarzwälder Hochwald in the county of Birkenfeld. Because the Soonwald extends over two counties — Rhein-Hunsrück and the Bad Kreuznach — the project needed the support of both. And because Bad Kreuznach was rather critical of the project, the decision went in favour of the Hochwald.

== Tourism ==
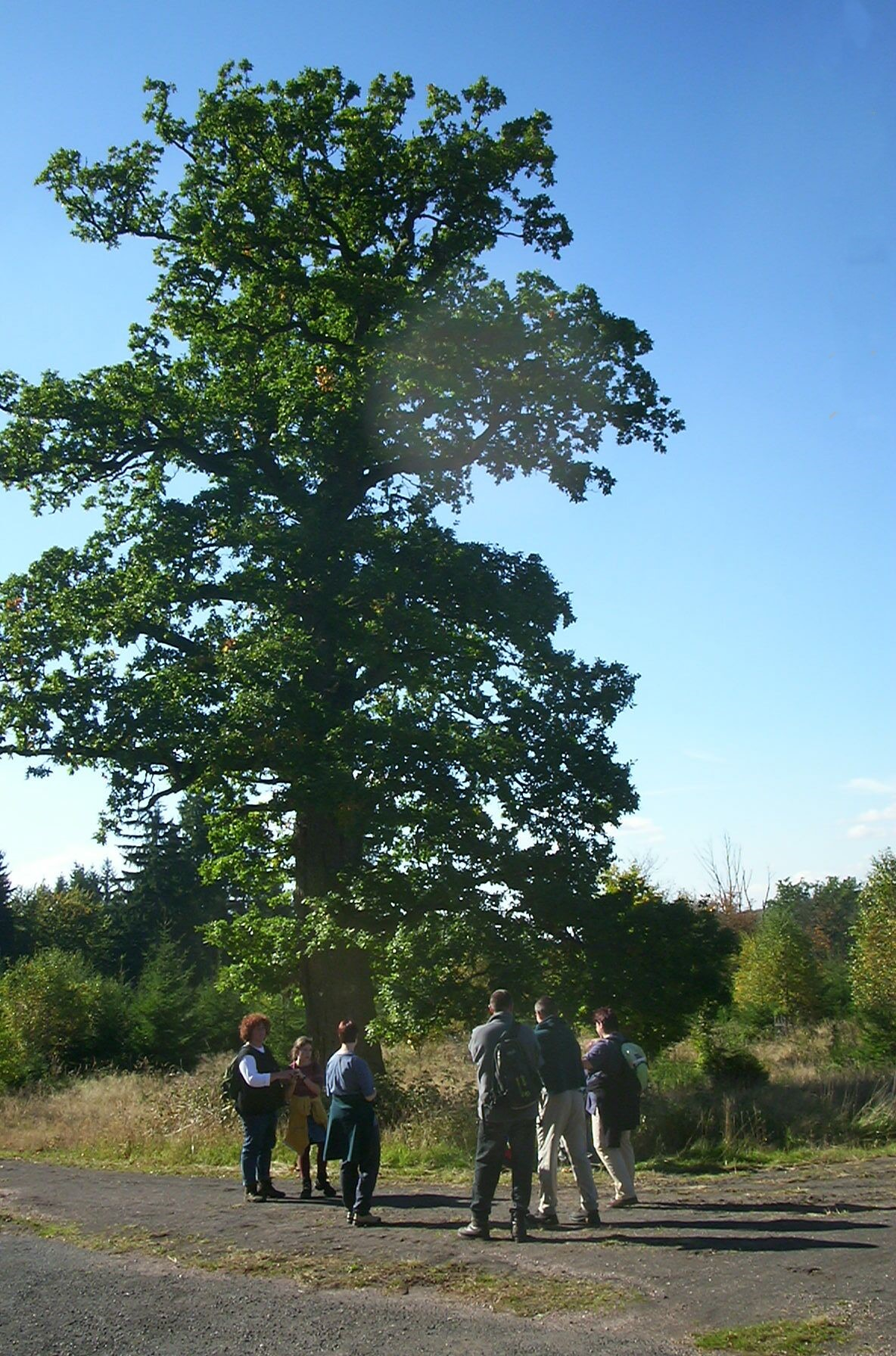
The Bollinger oak

Along the crest of the Soonwald run a section of the E3 European long distance path and the Soonwaldsteig trail (opened in 2009). Other attractions in the Soonwald or on its perimeter are:

- Koppenstein Castle
- Alteburg Tower
- Bollinger Oak
- Hunsrück Deer Conservation Park
- Wildburg castle ruins
- Schinderhannes Cave (Pferdsfeld)

Numerous woodland paths are also signed cycleways. In the north is the Schinderhannes-Soonwald Cycleway which runs through the Brühl and Lametbach valleys.

== Literature ==
- Erich Bauer: Der Soonwald. Auf den Spuren des Jägers aus Kurpfalz. DRW-Verlag, Stuttgart, 1974.
- Uwe Anhäuser: Sagenhafter Hunsrück. Rhein-Mosel-Verlag, Alf, 1995, ISBN 3-929745-23-2.
- Uwe Anhäuser: Kultur-Erlebnis Hunsrück. Literaturverlag Dr. Gebhardt und Hilden, Idar-Oberstein, 2000, ISBN 3-932515-29-3.
- Uwe Anhäuser: Schinderhannes und seine Bande. Rhein-Mosel-Verlag, Alf, 2003, ISBN 3-89801-014-7.
- Uwe Anhäuser: Die Ausoniusstraße von Bingen über den Hunsrück nach Trier. Ein archäologischer Reise- und Wanderführer. Rhein-Mosel-Verlag, Alf, 2006, ISBN 3-89801-032-5.
- Heinz Fischer: Der Hunsrück. Portrait eines Mittelgebirges. Heinz-Fischer-Selbstverlag, Koblenz, 2009, ISBN 978-3-00-027955-3.
