= Windpark Ellern =

Wind farm in Rhineland-Palatinate, Germany

Wind Farm Ellern
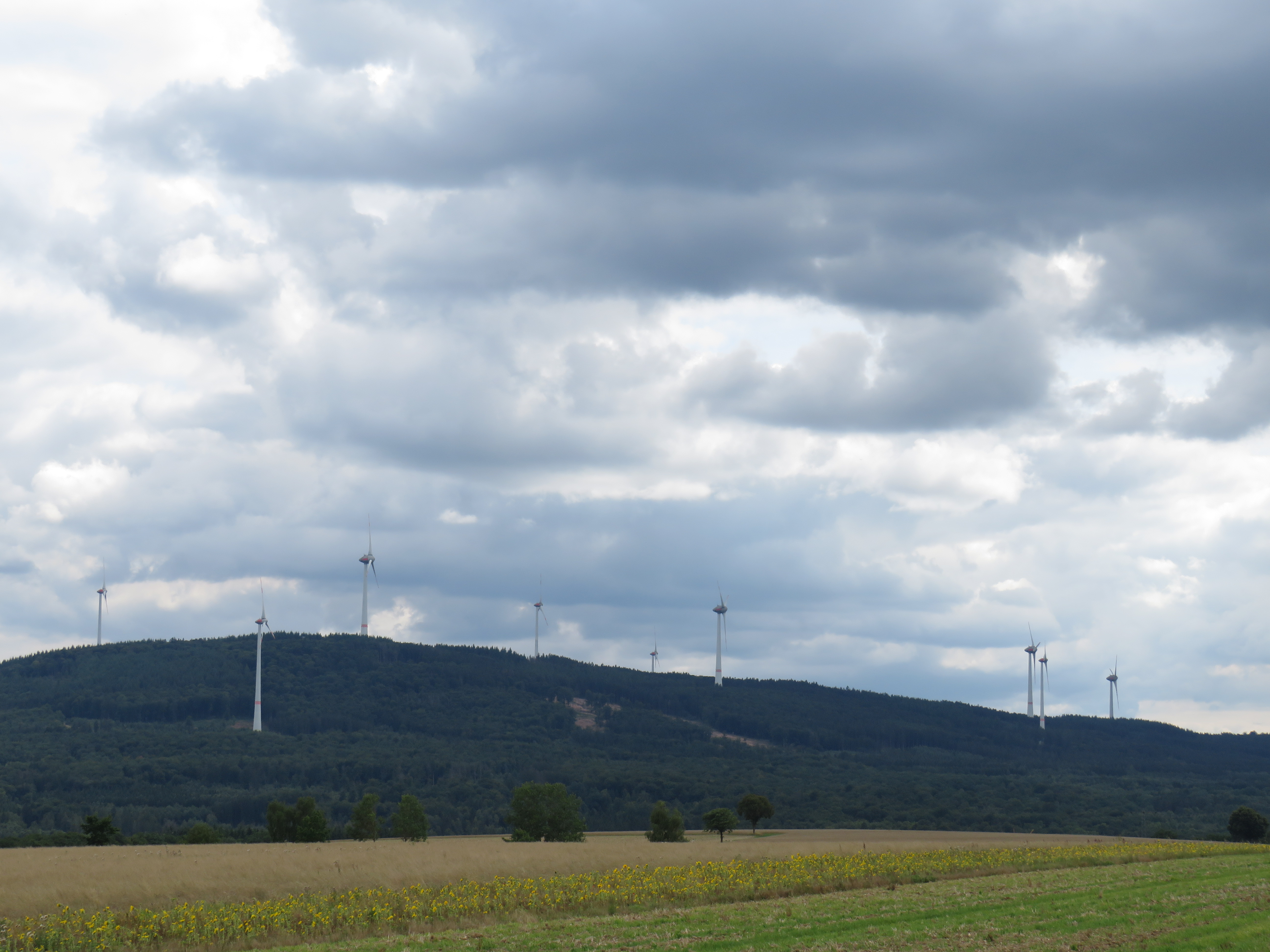
- Wind Farm on Northern Dichtelbach
- Official name: Windpark Ellern
- Country: Germany
- Location: Rhineland-Palatinate
- Coordinates: 49°58′05″N 7°39′36″E
- Owners: juwi AG, VERBUND AG
- Operators: juwi AG, VERBUND Green Power Deutschland GmbH

External links
- Website: juwi Windpark Ellern
- Commons: Related media on Commons

== Wind Farm Ellern ==
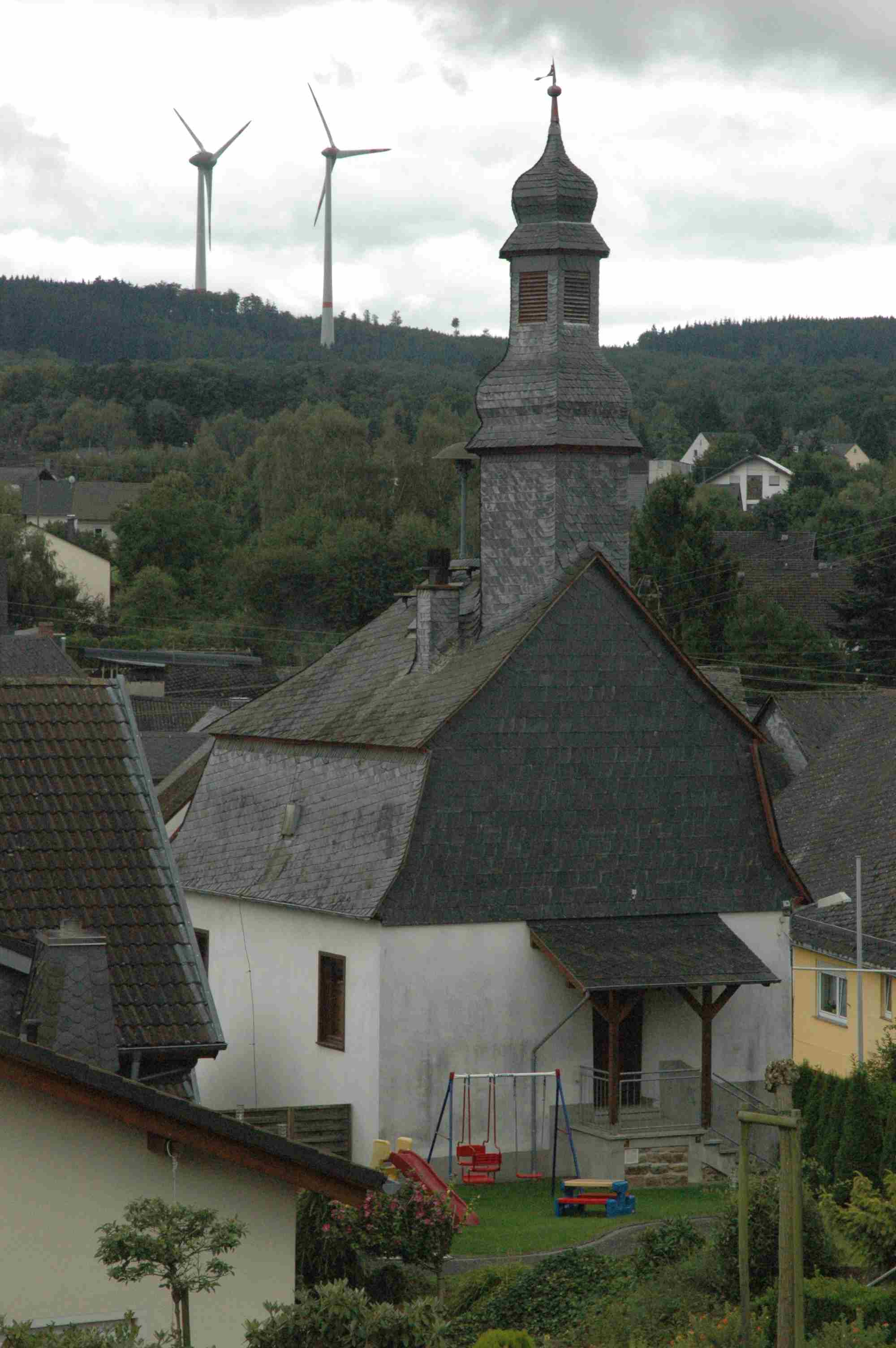
Windpark Ellern, with the village of Ellern in the foreground.

Wind Farm Ellern (Windpark Ellern) is a wind farm in the municipality of Ellern, within the city of Rheinböllen. It is located in Rhineland-Palatinate within the district of Rhein-Hunsrück-Kreis. The owner of Wind Farm Ellern along with the owner of Bad Kreuznach, remodeled the Wind Farm Soonwald alongside its 16 wind turbines. Wind Farm Ellern was built within the years 2012-2013 by planning Company juwi. According to the energy company juwi, the eight wind turbine facility is capable of generating up to 46.5MW of energy, enough to power 33,000 residences and other buildings of other purposes, and cut down 84,700 tonnes of carbon dioxide emissions, equivalent to taking 18,140 fossil-fed cars off the road. 5 of the park's turbines are of the type ENERCON E-126. They are currently one of the most powerful turbine facilities in the world with a normal capacity of 7.58 kW per turbine. At this time the Wind Farm itself belongs to the most powerful inland area of Southern Germany.

== Location ==
Wind Farm Ellern is located in the Hunsrück, a mountain range that includes the Soonwald. The Soonwald reaches around 2126 ft (648 m) above sea level at the highest point, that being the Hochsteinchen mountain. The wind turbines are located alongside the mountain ridge in forested territory between the road L 239 in the west and the peak of the Hochsteinchen in the east. Four of the wind turbines stand on the border of Ellern and Rheinböllen. Three turbines are immediately south of the municipality Seibersbach in Rhein-Hunsrück-Kreis. The nearest larger city is the district capital of Simmern ~6.2 miles (10 km) northwest. Other nearby cities include Bingen ~9.3 miles (15 km), Mainz ~28 miles (45 km) to the east, Koblenz ~28 miles (45 km) to the north, and Bad Kreuznach about ~12.4 miles (20 km) southeast.

== History ==
The construction of wind turbines on the Soonwald Ridge was proposed as early as the 2000s. The communities Ellern, Rheinböllen and Seibersbach declared the Soonwald Ridge as a wind development area. In May 2010, a study was ordered for the proposed wind turbine locations in Seibersbach and Dörrebach. One turbine of type ENERCON E-101 was already under construction at the time, which was eventually completed as well.

The Wind Farm was planned by the company juwi in Wörrstadt. Juwi was also developing a range of other parks in the vicinity of other European countries. The owners and operators are juwi and the Austrian company Verbund AG, which means Austria owns 51% of the Wind Farm. Both companies operate the Wind Farm together, with the estate portfolio, circa 2012, comprising 21 wind turbines in the area, which also include the Wind Farms of Seibersbach-Hochsteinchen and Seibersbach/Dörrebach.

The Construction of 8 wind turbine facilities on Wind Farm Ellern began on March 2nd, 2012. At the time, the approvals for the construction had not yet been submitted. The County Administration of Simmern gave an emergency approval for the clearance of forested lands to the company juwi. The approval was given due to the wildcats living by the Soonwald, so they wouldn’t disturb them from rearing their offspring.

The actual start of construction for the wind turbine facilities after approval was given began in May. The plan was initially to finalize all eight turbines by the end of the year. The precast concrete components of the towers were transported from the Enercon-Werk in Magdeburg with a ship from Trier. Then from there by truck along Highway 50, carried through Argenthal along the road L-242 to the forest Construction Zones. The two-tier rotor blades, engines, and generators were supplied directly from the plant manufacturer Enercon.

On August 28th, 2012, the first of the five wind turbine facilities of type ENERCON E-126 was successfully set up, with a massive 150 ton engine and reaching ~443 ft (135 m) high. The first ENERCON E-136 wind turbine went into operation on October 29th, 2012 and by midway through December, all five turbines were online.

The three wind turbines of type ENERCON E-101 were constructed identically with three wind turbines on the Seibersbach-Hochsteinchen farm and five on Wind Farm Seibersbach/Dörrebach. All of them were constructed by the middle of 2013, and the 3 parks officially opened alongside a ceremony held on September 17th, 2013.

=== Criticism of the Site Selection ===
Criticism of the site selection was targeted towards everyone on the Bürgerinitiative Soonwald e.V, the NABU, the BUND, and the Bürgerinitiative Gegenwind Soonwald e.V. They criticized all of them for their opinions toward the lack of conservation measures, especially for the wildlife on the construction site. The wind turbines release high-frequency turbulence that compromises the sight of all 14 bat species living in the Soonwald. Their extinction would also threaten the wildcats living in the Soonwald. Further criticism is of the organization's premature beginning of clearing the forest without a proper approval permit.

Juwi denies the accusations. The wind farm is associated with energy transition and conservation, juwi stated on the farm's official website. Juwi would also later relocate the spruce monoculture of the cleared land onto another site via mixed forest substitution and thereby create new habitats for the bats.

== Technical Structure ==
The Wind Farm declared 8 turbines of type ENERCON E-126 and 3 of type ENERCON E-101. The former model possesses a normal capacity of about 7.58 MW for a hub height of ~442.9 ft (135 m), a rotor diameter of ~417 ft (127 m), and an overall height of ~651.2 ft (198.5 m). These were, at the time of their construction in 2012, the most powerful onshore wind turbines in the world. The latter turbine models on this site, likewise, possess a hub height of ~442.9 ft (135 m) with a rotor diameter of ~331.4 ft (101 m) and an overall height of ~608.6 ft (185.5 m). The normal capacity of them amounts to around 3.05 MW. The projected yearly energy gain of the wind farm lies around 120 million Kilowatt hours of electrical energy, which is roughly equal to the power of 33,000 households.

Type	Output	Hub Height	Rotor Diameter	Total Height	Number of Wind Turbines	Year Constructed	Planners	Operators
ENERCON E-126	7,58 MW	~442.9 ft (135 m)	~417 ft (127 m)	~651.2 ft (198,5 m)	5	2012	juwi AG, VERBUND AG	VERBUND Green Power Deutschland GmbH
ENERCON E-101	3,05 MW	~442.9 ft (135 m)	~331.4 ft (101 m)	~608.6 ft (185,5 m)	3	2013	juwi AG, VERBUND AG	VERBUND Green Power Deutschland GmbH
