= Gebroth =

- Municipality
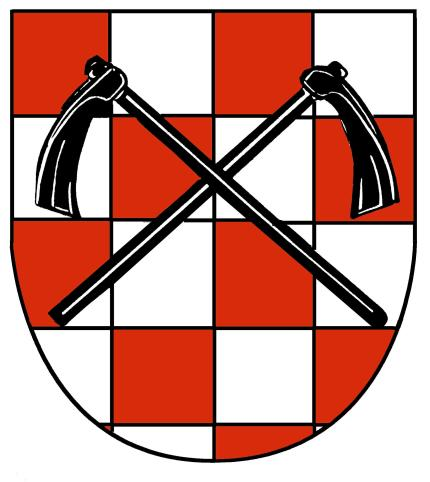
- Coat of arms

- Location of Gebroth within Bad Kreuznach district
- Interactive map of Gebroth
- Location within Germany Location within Rhineland-Palatinate
- Coordinates: 49°52′45″N 07°39′36″E
- Country: Germany
- State: Rhineland-Palatinate
- District: Bad Kreuznach
- Municipal assoc.: Rüdesheim

Government
  - Mayor (2019–24): Jürgen Klitzke

Area
  - Total: 2.36 km^{2} (0.91 sq mi)
- Elevation: 360 m (1,180 ft)

Population (2025-12-31)
  - Total: 131
  - Density: 55.5/km^{2} (144/sq mi)
- Time zone: UTC+01:00 (CET)
  - Summer (DST): UTC+02:00 (CEST)
- Postal codes: 55595
- Dialling codes: 06756
- Vehicle registration: KH
- Website: www.gebroth.eu

Gebroth is an Ortsgemeinde – a municipality belonging to a Verbandsgemeinde, a kind of collective municipality – in the Bad Kreuznach district in Rhineland-Palatinate, Germany. It belongs to the Verbandsgemeinde of Rüdesheim, whose seat is in the municipality of Rüdesheim an der Nahe. Gebroth is a state-recognized tourism community and a member of the Soonwald-Nahe Nature Park sponsorship association.

== Geography ==
=== Location ===
Gebroth lies on the upper reaches of the Ellerbach in the southern Hunsrück between the Soonwald and the Gauchswald at an elevation of some 360 m above sea level. The municipal area measures 236 ha, of which 18 ha is wooded. Gebroth lies in the middle of the Soonwald-Nahe Nature Park.

=== Neighbouring municipalities ===
Clockwise from the north, Gebroth’s neighbours are the municipalities of Spall, Allenfeld, Winterburg and Winterbach, all of which likewise lie within the Bad Kreuznach district.

== History ==
In 1211, Gebroth had its first documentary mention in the directory of holdings kept by Eberbach Abbey in the Rheingau when Hermann Brucho transferred to the Church land that he had acquired from two vassals from Gebehardisrodte. It can be assumed that this swathe of land had already been settled in Roman times, bearing witness to which are several archaeological finds. An old Roman road led through the village, coming from Kreuznach and leading onwards to Trier and Simmern. Beginning in 1226, Gebroth belonged to the “Hinder” County of Sponheim and passed in 1437, together with the tradition-rich Amt of Winterburg, to the Margraviate of Baden. From the Reformation onwards, Gebroth was the parish seat for several surrounding municipalities. In the middle of the village, on a rocky knoll, a church was built in 1580 and was girded by a defensive wall. In 1906, this church, which had fallen into disrepair, was replaced with a new one. Next to the church stands the old rectory, which dates from 1760. Today, the parish is known as Gebroth-Winterburg, and is currently tended by a woman pastor who lives in Bockenau. Towards the end of the 16th century, there was already a school in Gebroth that was attended almost exclusively by boys. On the occasion of a visit by the then school inspector, named Jakobi, in 1592, he reported that a fine school had been established in Gebroth and that it was a joy to see it. Until 1968, the municipality had a primary one-room schoolhouse, whereafter it was dissolved. The building was then sold and torn down. Quite early on, the municipality sold its forest and grazing rights in the Soonwald to the state so that it could build its own water supply system, which with additions and renovations to some parts is still in use today. The sewer network with mechanical sewage treatment plant was built in 1960. Gebroth is nowadays linked to the Ellerbachtal sewage treatment plant. In the course of administrative restructuring in Rhineland-Palatinate, Gebroth was grouped into the Verbandsgemeinde of Rüdesheim in 1970.

=== Population development ===
Gebroth’s population development since Napoleonic times is shown in the table below. The figures for the years from 1871 to 1987 are drawn from census data:

Year	Inhabitants
1815	211
1835	279
1871	334
1905	259
1939	203

Year	Inhabitants
1950	230
1961	210
1970	207
1987	144
2005	172

== Religion ==
As at 30 September 2013, there are 162 full-time residents in Gebroth, and of those, 93 are Evangelical (57.407%), 39 are Catholic (24.074%), 2 (1.235%) belong to other religious groups and 28 (17.284%) either have no religion or will not reveal their religious affiliation.

== Politics ==
=== Municipal council ===
The council is made up of 6 council members, who were elected by majority vote at the municipal election held on 7 June 2009, and the honorary mayor as chairman.

=== Mayor ===
Gebroth’s mayor is Jürgen Klitzke.

=== Coat of arms ===
The municipality’s arms might be described thus: Chequy of twenty gules and argent two hoes in saltire, the blades to chief, sable.

== Culture and sightseeing ==
=== Buildings ===
The following are listed buildings or sites in Rhineland-Palatinate’s Directory of Cultural Monuments:

- Evangelical church, Schulstraße 5 – aisleless church, Romanesquified Heimatstil, marked 1906, Government Master Builder August Senz, Cologne
- Schulstraße 7 – Evangelical rectory; Late Baroque solid building, partly slated timber framing, marked 1760, abutting former commercial building resembling estate complex along the street

=== Church ===
From the Reformation onwards, Gebroth was the parish seat for a number of surrounding villages. Built in 1580 on a rocky knoll in the middle of the village was a church, ringed by a defensive wall. In 1906, this old round church, which had fallen into disrepair after being damaged in a fire, was replaced with a new one.

=== Clubs ===
The following clubs are currently active in Gebroth:

- Freiwillige Feuerwehr — volunteer fire brigade
- Hundezucht — dog breeding club
- Kirchenchor — church choir
- Männerchor — men’s choir
- Rassegeflügelzüchter — club for breeding poultry breeds
  - Found in Gebroth is the seat of the regional association of poultry “breed breeders” for Rhine-Moselle-Nahe-Hünsrück.
- Reit-, Fahr- und Zuchtverein Ellerbachtal e.V. — club for riding and horse breeding

=== Regular events ===
At one farm in Gebroth, called Gestüt Ellerbachtal, formed an equestrian horse riding club and each year there are riding and show jumping tournaments.

== Economy and infrastructure ==
=== Economic structure ===
Gebroth is a small municipality with fewer than 200 inhabitants. Nonetheless, it has all the necessary public institutions, although unfortunately there are no longer any shops. Villagers can be supplied with everyday needs by mobile dealers in such things as baked goods, groceries, fruits, vegetables and meat. Over the years, the municipality has undergone a shift from a purely agricultural orientation to a more residential one. There are only three farms left that are run as main sources of income, but one of these has dedicated itself wholly to equestrianism. A great number of the inhabitants who are in the workforce must commute to work each day, mostly to Bad Kreuznach or Mainz, but a few even go as far as Frankfurt.

=== Education ===
There is no longer a school of any kind in Gebroth. The old school was dissolved in 1968. Primary school pupils now go to school in Wallhausen, as do older students, as that municipality has a Regionalschule. There are also other schools in Hargesheim and Bad Kreuznach. The kindergarten in Winterbach is also intended for children from Gebroth.

=== Transport ===
Running through Gebroth are Kreisstraßen 26 and 27. These are part of a road network that links the village to main highways, but these lie quite far away, with Bundesstraße 41 running by some 7 km to the south and Bundesstraße 50 meeting the Autobahn A 61 at Rheinböllen some 13 km to the north. Serving nearby Bad Sobernheim is a railway station on the Nahe Valley Railway (Bingen–Saarbrücken).
