= Ellern =

- Municipality
- Coat of arms

- Location of Ellern within Rhein-Hunsrück-Kreis district
- Interactive map of Ellern
- Location within Germany Location within Rhineland-Palatinate
- Coordinates: 49°59′06″N 7°38′40″E
- Country: Germany
- State: Rhineland-Palatinate
- District: Rhein-Hunsrück-Kreis
- Municipal assoc.: Simmern-Rheinböllen

Government
  - Mayor (2019–24): Friedhelm Dämgen

Area
  - Total: 9.34 km^{2} (3.61 sq mi)
- Elevation: 420 m (1,380 ft)

Population (2025-12-31)
  - Total: 894
  - Density: 95.7/km^{2} (248/sq mi)
- Time zone: UTC+01:00 (CET)
  - Summer (DST): UTC+02:00 (CEST)
- Postal codes: 55497
- Dialling codes: 06764
- Vehicle registration: SIM

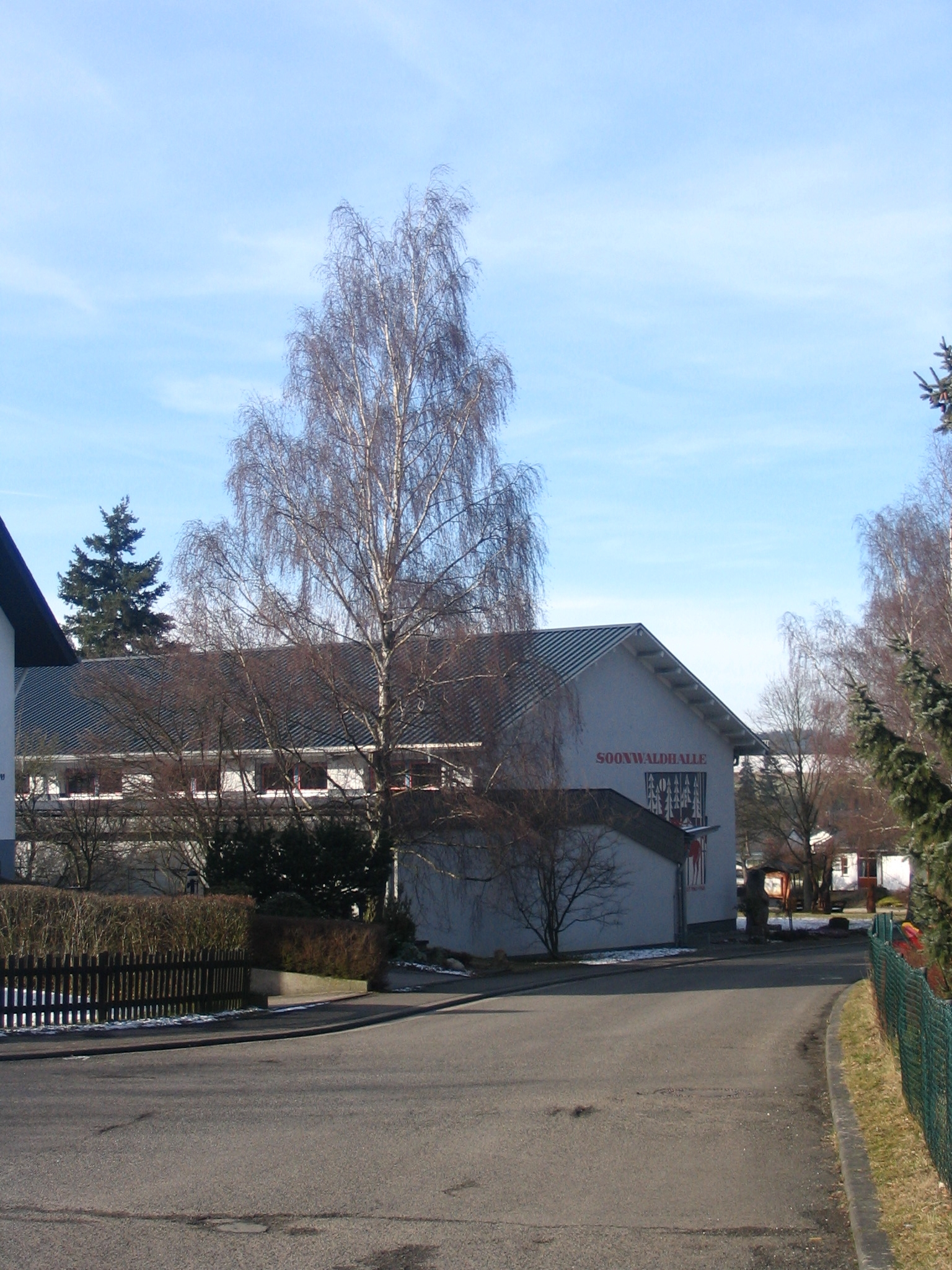
Soonwaldhalle

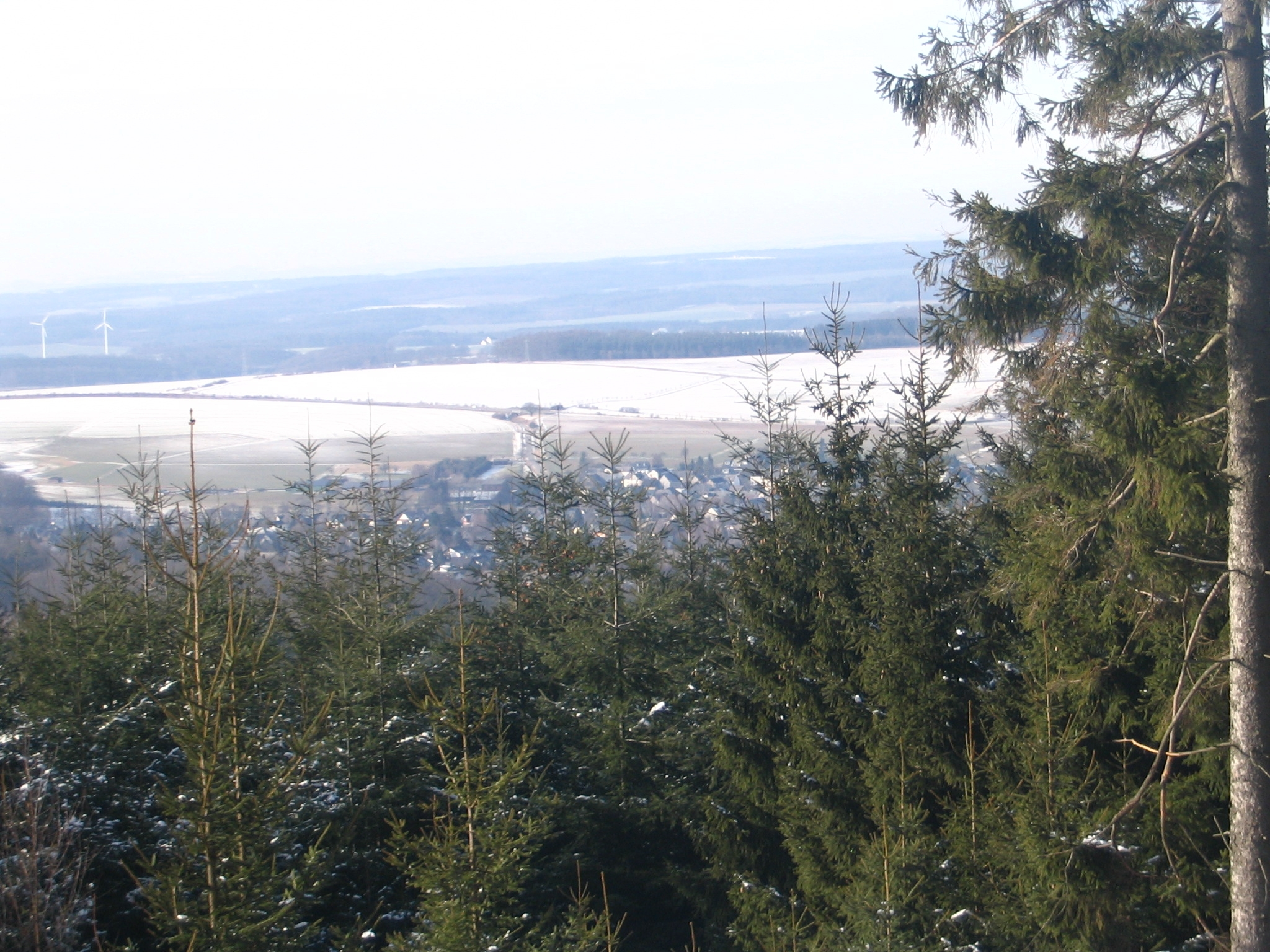
The village seen from the Soonwald

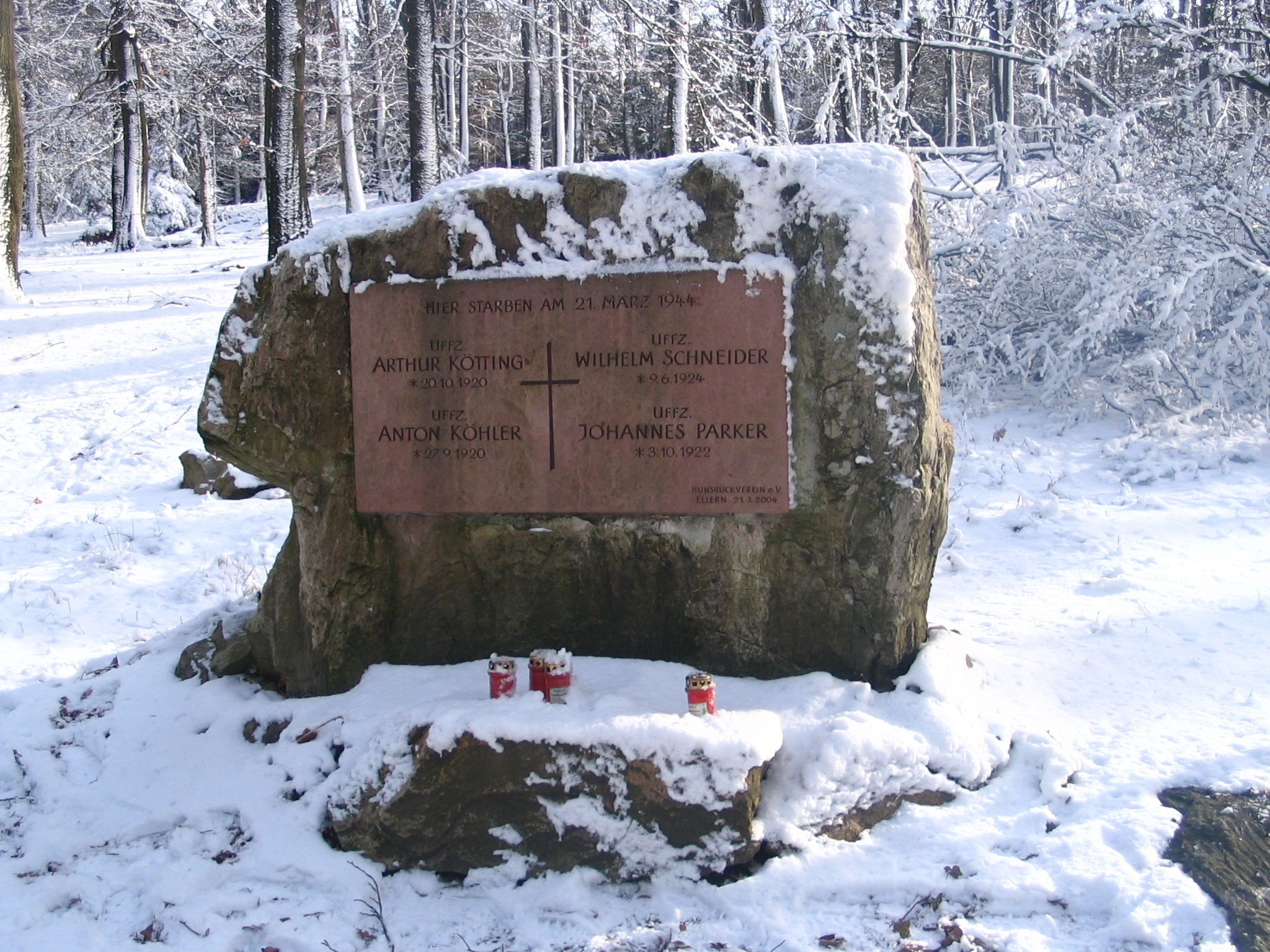
Memorial stone in the Soonwald near Ellern

Ellern (German pronunciation: [ˈɛlɐn]) is an Ortsgemeinde – a municipality belonging to a Verbandsgemeinde, a kind of collective municipality – in the Rhein-Hunsrück-Kreis (district) in Rhineland-Palatinate, Germany. It belongs to the Verbandsgemeinde Simmern-Rheinböllen, whose seat is in Simmern.

== Geography ==
=== Location ===
The municipality lies in the middle of the Hunsrück at the foot of the Soonwald (forest). Ellern lies some 10 km from the district seat of Simmern. Within quick reach is the Rhine valley with Bacharach, the Loreley, Oberwesel and Boppard.

The area within municipal limits comprises 10 km^{2}. Bordering right on Ellern's municipal limits (but within Argenthal’s) is the “Kloppwiesen” Nature Conservation Area.

=== Climate ===
Yearly precipitation in Ellern amounts to 788 mm, falling into the middle third of the precipitation chart for all Germany. At 60% of the German Weather Service's weather stations, lower figures are recorded. The driest month is September. The most rainfall comes in June. In that month, precipitation is twice what it is in September. Precipitation varies only slightly. At only 15% of the weather stations are lower seasonal swings recorded.

== History ==
In 1347, Ellern had its first documentary mention. At the time when the church in Mörschbach was consecrated in 1006, Ellern's current location was the Wüste Elira (Wüste literally means “desert” in German). It is therefore known that Ellern's founding fell sometime between 1006 and 1347. After the time of the Reformation, Ellern became mainly Evangelical. Beginning in 1794, Ellern lay under French rule. In 1814 it was assigned to the Kingdom of Prussia at the Congress of Vienna. Since 1946, it has been part of the then newly founded state of Rhineland-Palatinate.

=== Population development ===
What follows is a table of the municipality's population figures for selected years since the early 19th century (each time at 31 December):

Historical population

Year	Pop.	±%
1815	452	—
1835	497	+10.0%
1871	453	−8.9%
1905	475	+4.9%
1939	466	−1.9%
1950	578	+24.0%

Year	Pop.	±%
1961	623	+7.8%
1965	603	−3.2%
1970	604	+0.2%
1975	627	+3.8%
1980	654	+4.3%
1985	702	+7.3%

Year	Pop.	±%
1987	756	+7.7%
1990	786	+4.0%
1995	810	+3.1%
2000	851	+5.1%
2005	874	+2.7%
2006	858	−1.8%

Source: Statistisches Landesamt Rheinland-Pfalz

== Politics ==
=== Municipal council ===
The council is made up of 12 council members, who were elected by proportional representation at the municipal election held on 7 June 2009, and the honorary mayor as chairman.

The municipal election held on 7 June 2009 yielded the following results:

	SPD	CDU	WG	Total
2009	4	3	5	12 seats
2004	4	3	5	12 seats

=== Mayor ===
Ellern's mayor is Friedhelm Dämgen.

=== Coat of arms ===
The municipality's arms might be described thus: Argent in base a hillock with grass vert upon which a tree of the same, hanging by a riband of the same from a branch in sinister an inescutcheon quarterly, first sable a lion rampant Or, second lozengy argent and azure, third bendy lozengy of the same and fourth gules a mound banded and ensigned with a cross of the fourth.

The example shown here has a white background, which makes the edge of the shield impossible to see, but there is an escutcheon there. A further example of Ellern's arms can be seen at Heraldry of the World. This one seems to have exactly the same charges, but not quite the same tinctures, with the grassy hillock and tree being shown “proper” (that is, in their natural colours, with the tree's trunk shown in brown and the grass and leaves in green).

=== Town partnerships ===
Ellern fosters partnerships with the following places:

- (Germany) Sünna, Unterbreizbach, Wartburgkreis, Thuringia

== Culture and sightseeing ==
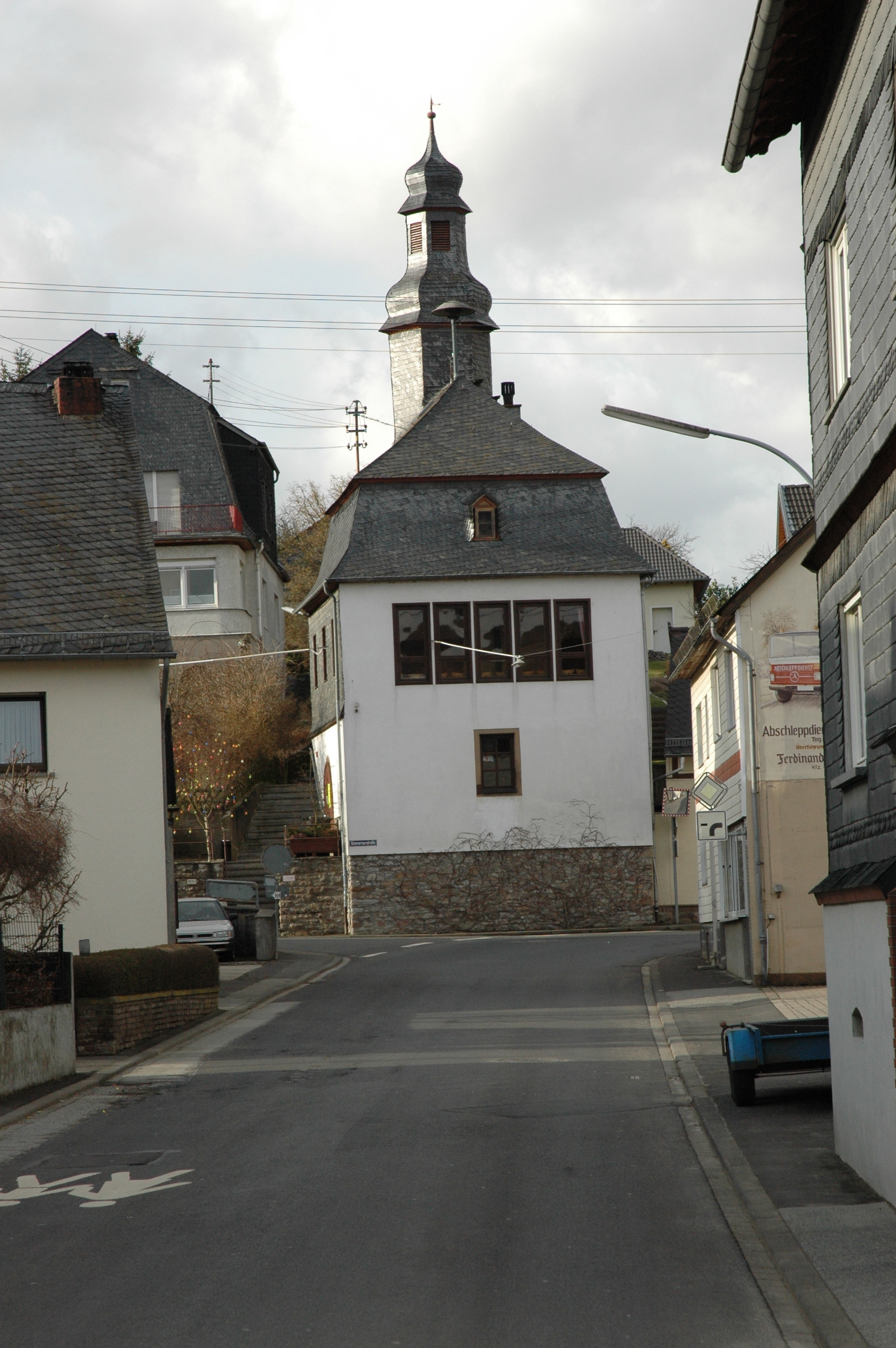
Simmerner Straße 2: Old Town Hall

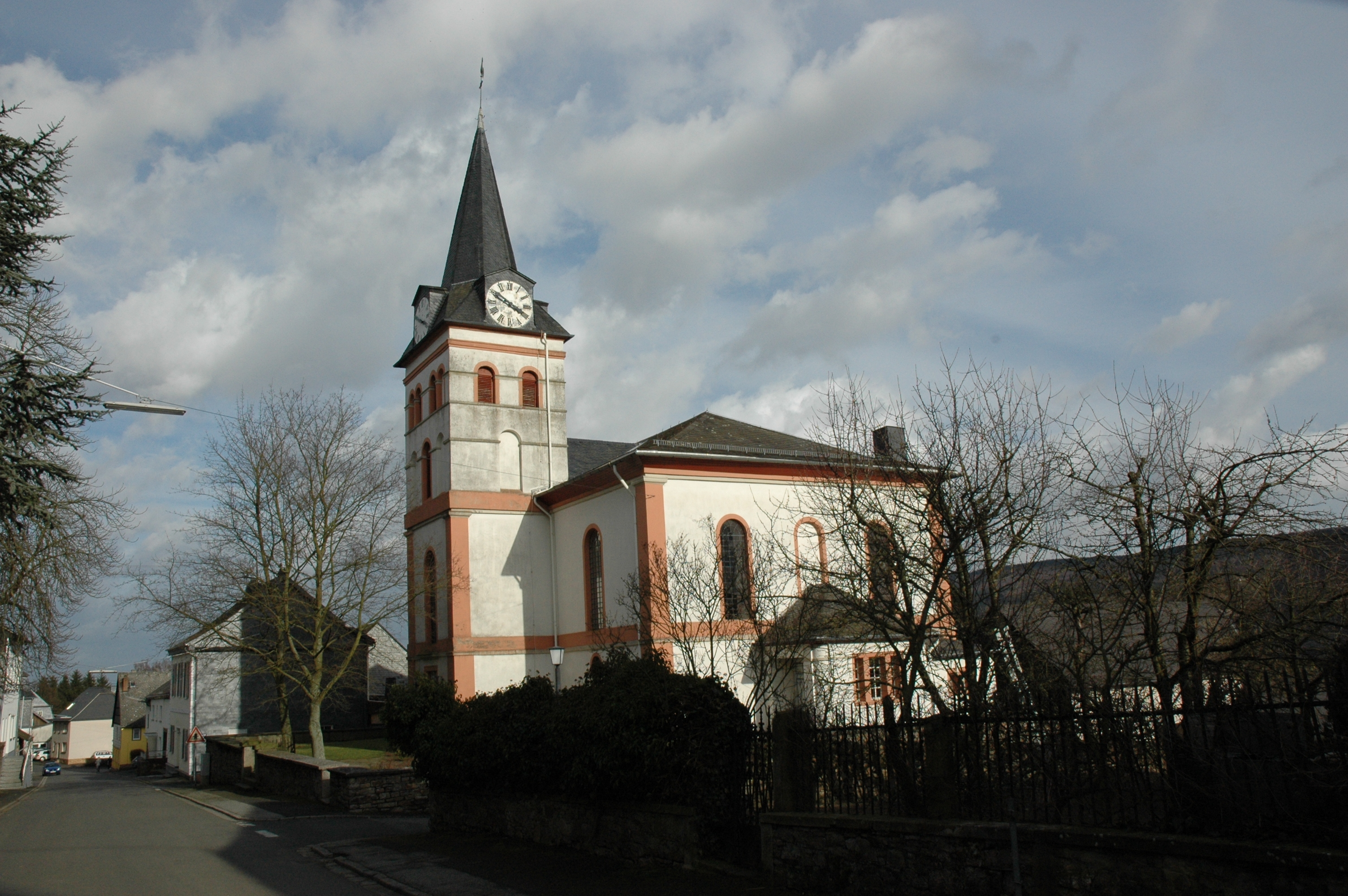
Simmerner Straße 7: Evangelical church

=== Buildings ===
The following are listed buildings or sites in Rhineland-Palatinate’s Directory of Cultural Monuments:

- Evangelical church, Simmerner Straße 7 – Classicist aisleless church, 1827-1829, architect Ferdinand Nebel, Koblenz
- Bahnhofstraße 50/52, 55 – no. 50/52: villa, partly slated, about 1910/1920, park with attendant’s house; no. 55: timber-frame commercial wing, marked 1936, administration building with hipped roof, partly timber-frame; whole complex of buildings
- Im Haferacker 4 – timber-frame Quereinhaus (a combination residential and commercial house divided for these two purposes down the middle, perpendicularly to the street), partly solid, marked 1736
- Rheinböllener Straße, Alter Friedhof (“Old Graveyard”) – warriors’ memorial, tombs, priest's tomb, about 1881, stele; Höltz tomb, stele
- Rheinböllener Straße 4 – former inn “Zur Post”; stately timber-frame Quereinhaus, plastered, hipped mansard roof, about 1800, stable/barn 19th century
- Simmerner Straße 2 – Altes Rathaus (“Old Town Hall”); building with hipped mansard roof, timber framing plastered or slated, 18th century
- Simmerner Straße 6 – bakehouse; one-floor quarrystone building, 19th century

=== Sport and leisure ===
Ellern is part of the Naturpark Soonwald-Nahe and offers many hiking trails and cycle paths.

=== Regular events ===
Given the wealth earned from the forest (see below), a few years ago the municipality launched the Holzkerb, or “Wood Fair”, giving Ellern the opportunity to exhibit wood and various wooden articles in a thematized fashion. The Soonwaldfee (“Soonwald Fairy”), who is chosen on the occasion of the Holzkerb, personifies and underscores how near the municipality is to the woods and their use. The Holzkerb is held each year on the fourth weekend in August.

== Economy and infrastructure ==
=== Transport ===
Ellern's location is favourable for quickly reaching the Autobahn A 61, and there is a good road link to Frankfurt-Hahn Airport over Bundesstraße 50.

Earning the municipality a considerable income from the nearby forest is the local wood industry. For some 100 years, there has been a sawmill, which offers many jobs.

=== Energy ===
Ellern is home to a 46.5MW wind turbine facility simply known as Windpark Ellern. While the wind park has been controversial, it has been producing CO^2 savings enough to take out of the roads of Germany 18,000 vehicles, so it certainly is paying back the build cost.
