= Mengerschied =

- Municipality
- Coat of arms

- Location of Mengerschied within Rhein-Hunsrück-Kreis district
- Interactive map of Mengerschied
- Location within Germany Location within Rhineland-Palatinate
- Coordinates: 49°54′51″N 7°30′41″E
- Country: Germany
- State: Rhineland-Palatinate
- District: Rhein-Hunsrück-Kreis
- Municipal assoc.: Simmern-Rheinböllen

Government
  - Mayor (2019–24): Carsten Halm

Area
  - Total: 9.53 km^{2} (3.68 sq mi)
- Elevation: 330 m (1,080 ft)

Population (2025-12-31)
  - Total: 708
  - Density: 74.3/km^{2} (192/sq mi)
- Time zone: UTC+01:00 (CET)
  - Summer (DST): UTC+02:00 (CEST)
- Postal codes: 55490
- Dialling codes: 06765
- Vehicle registration: SIM
- Website: www.mengerschied.de

Mengerschied is an Ortsgemeinde – a municipality belonging to a Verbandsgemeinde, a kind of collective municipality – in the Rhein-Hunsrück-Kreis (district) in Rhineland-Palatinate, Germany. It belongs to the Verbandsgemeinde Simmern-Rheinböllen, whose seat is in Simmern.

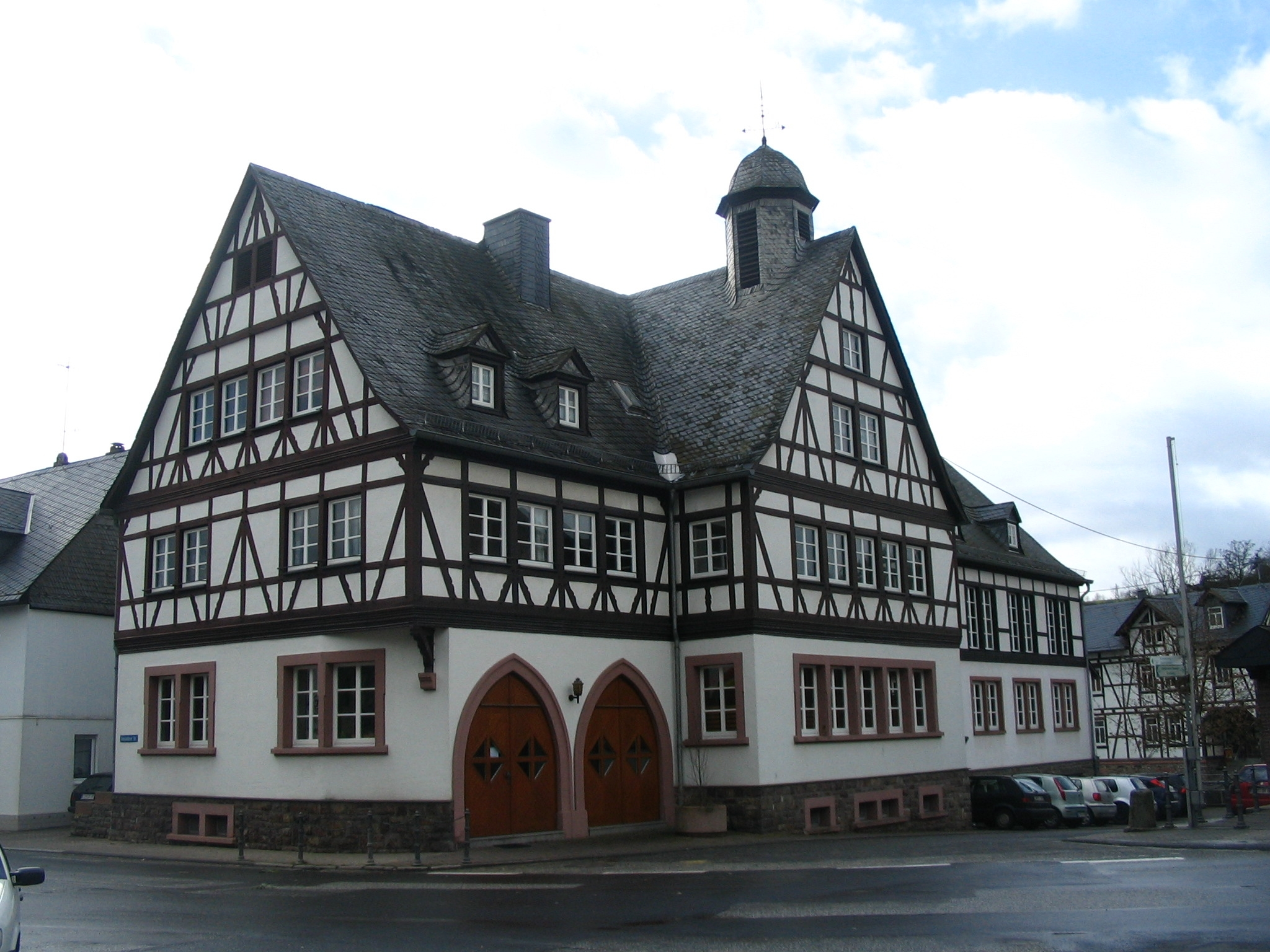
Municipal building in the village centre

== Geography ==
=== Location ===
The municipality lies at the foot of the Soonwald, a heavily wooded section of the west-central Hunsrück, in the valley of the Lametbach. The Lamet and the Brühlbach flow together in the village and thence towards the Kellenbach. Mengerschied lies roughly 7 km south of Simmern and 7 km southeast of Kirchberg. Its elevation is 325 m above sea level

== History ==
Mengerschied is among the oldest places in the district. About 1080, Mengerschied had its first documentary mention as Mengezerodt. The name changed over the 15th and 16th centuries from Mengersroit to Mengersrade (1502), Mengerschitt (1584) and then Mengerschied (1785). The church named in the document was consecrated to the Apostles Philip and James and the holy virgin Saint Walpurga and was under the care of the Ravengiersburg Monastery. It was a parish church with baptismal rights, as witnessed to this day by the 15th-century baptismal font at the graveyard. The church itself became both the Protestants’ and the Catholics’ graveyard church after the Reformation, when the Protestants built their own church in the village. The graveyard church fell into disrepair during the 18th century.

Many Hunsrück knights and noble families had holdings in Mengersrode that over the centuries, through donations and sales, were transferred to the Ravengiersburg Monastery and the Amt of Koppenstein. Mengerschied belonged administratively to the provost's parish (Probstei) of Ravengiersburg, to the Oberamt of Simmern and to the like-named duchy, within which it was the biggest settlement, having in 1785 a church, two schools, three mills and 50 families.

As elsewhere in the Hunsrück, the Thirty Years' War decimated the population. Beginning in 1794, Mengerschied lay under French rule. In 1815 it was assigned to the Kingdom of Prussia at the Congress of Vienna. A catastrophic fire in 1841 that destroyed 28 buildings and led to a year of widespread hunger had the effect of making 50 persons from the village emigrate to Brazil, the United States, the United Kingdom and South Africa. The two world wars claimed more than 80 victims from among the village's men.

A great number of handicrafts, agriculture, forestry and slate mining were long the villagers’ main livelihoods, although with growing industrialization, many men were seeking work in the Saarland and the Ruhr area to finance their homes. The Second World War brought Mengerschied not only casualties but great damage from artillery fire. Since 1946, Mengerschied has been part of the then newly founded state of Rhineland-Palatinate. After the war, a whole new way of life came to the village's economy. The 400-hectare forest, the Hochwald – heavily damaged by the storm Wiebke in 1990 – and the hunting associated with it have long yielded income to finance municipal work. The Feldmark (a common noun, not a proper name), the area of farmland comprising some 450 ha and traditionally marked with boundary stones, was once worked by some 70 small farmers (1950), a number that has now shrunk to 4 full-time farmers.

== Politics ==
=== Municipal council ===
The council is made up of 12 council members, who were elected by majority vote at the municipal election held on 7 June 2009, and the honorary mayor as chairman.

=== Mayor ===
Mengerschied's mayor is Carsten Halm.

=== Coat of arms ===
The German blazon reads: Schild von eingebogener erniedrigter silberner Spitze, darin ein schwarzer Taufstein, begleitet von vier Eichenblättern, gespalten; rechts blau silberne Rauten, links ein rotbewehrter und -bezungter goldener Löwe in Schwarz.

The municipality's arms might in English heraldic language be described thus: Tierced in mantle dexter bendy paly lozengy sinister argent and azure, sinister sable a lion rampant Or armed and langued gules, and in base argent a baptismal font of the third above an arc of four oakleaves palewise vert.

The Wittelsbach lozenges on the dexter (armsbearer's right, viewer's left) side and the Palatine Lion on the sinister (armsbearer's left, viewer's right) side refer to the village's former allegiance to the Duchy of Simmern and Electoral Palatinate. The same charges can be found on the 1701 Mengerschied court seal. The baptismal font refers to the one in the graveyard. The oakleaves stand for four oaks in the municipality that are centuries old and are recognized as natural monuments.

The arms have been borne since 5 December 1980.

== Culture and sightseeing ==
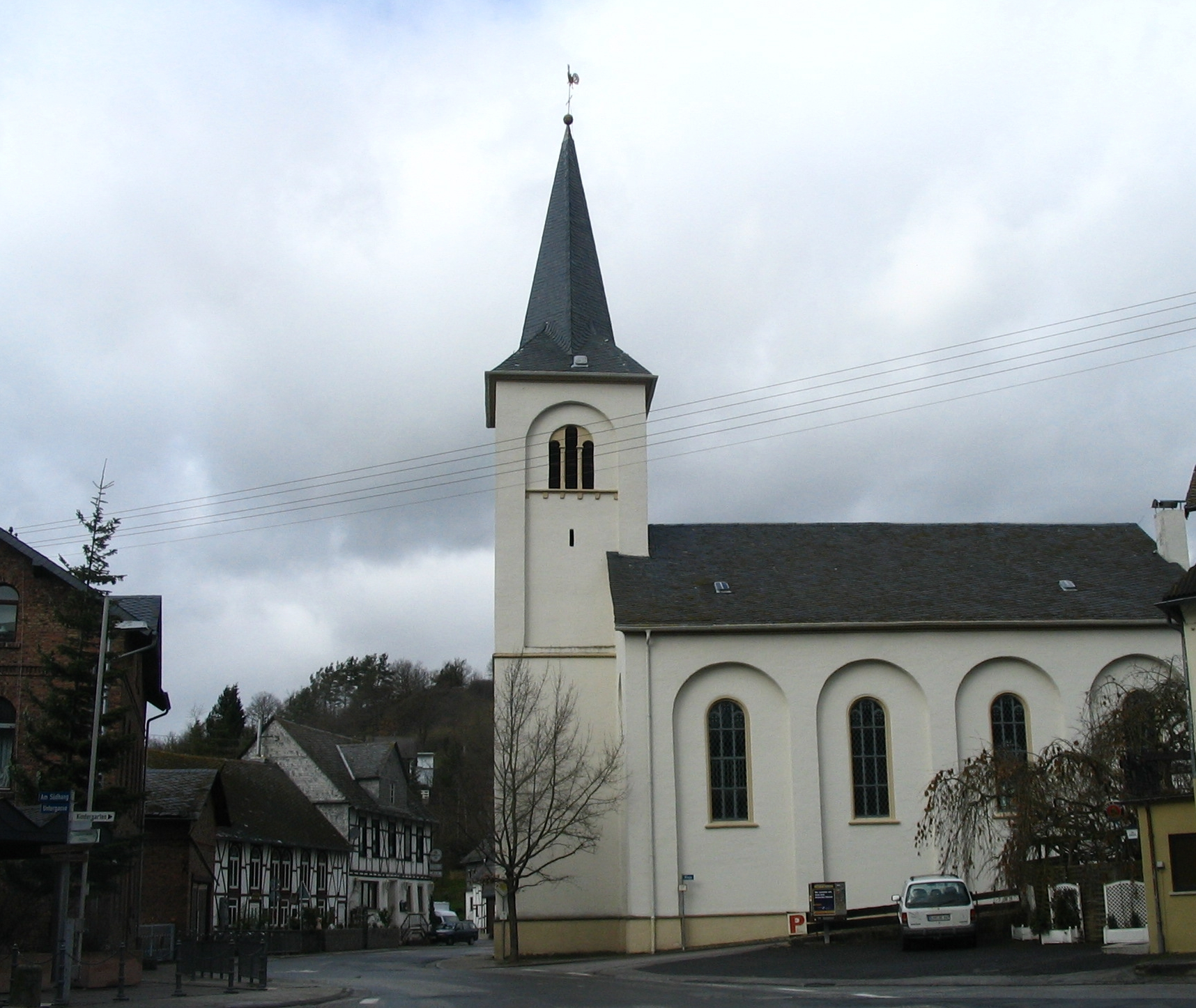
Church in the village centre

=== Buildings ===
The following are listed buildings or sites in Rhineland-Palatinate’s Directory of Cultural Monuments:

- Evangelical church, Simmerner Straße – Classicist aisleless church, Rundbogenstil, 1842/1843, architect Johann Claudius von Lassaulx, Koblenz, revised by District Master Builder Herborn
- Graveyard – Late Gothic sandstone baptismal font from the former Saint Walpurga’s Church
- Gemündener Straße 1 – municipal building; stately timber-frame building, partly solid, 1930s
- Simmerner Straße 3 – dance hall; big Late Historicist timber-frame building, about 1900
- Soonwaldstraße 13 – timber-frame house, partly solid, sided, half-hipped roof, earlier half of the 19th century
- Wildburger Straße 8a – timber-frame house, partly solid, sided or slated, half-hipped roof, early 19th century
- Wildburg castle ruin, south of the village – on a quartzite cliff remnants of a keep, first mentioned in 1253, to the south a “wall moat”, to the north a moat
- Landschulheim Soonruhe, south of the village – one-floor building with hipped mansard roof, two towers, 1933

=== Sport and leisure ===
The village is well linked to the Hunsrück's hiking and cycle path (Schinderhannes-Soonwald-Radweg) network between Simmern and Gemünden. Many kinds of outings are possible with the Soonwald, which is right on the municipality's outskirts.

== Economy and infrastructure ==
The majority of workers in Mengerschied is employed in the service sector. In the municipality itself, only a few craft businesses can still be found, such as bakers, butchers, carpenters and painters.

=== Transport ===
Public transport is provided by a bus link to the district seat of Simmern and to Martinstein on the river Nahe, Germany's smallest municipality by land area.

=== Education ===
Mengerschied's 300 years of school history came to an end in 1993. The four-classroom school building built in 1962 now houses a three-group kindergarten.

== Mengerschied in the media ==
The Soonwald Schlößchen (“Soonwald Little Castle”) run by Soonwald Schlößchen Bildungsstätte GmbH on Mengerschied's outskirts is the setting of the television series Die Bräuteschule 1958 (“The Brides’ School 1958”), made in April and May 2006 and first broadcast on ARD in January 2007, in which ten home economics students, within the framework of a “time travel” scenario, spend six weeks living under simulated conditions of the 1950s.
