= Henau =

- Municipality
- Coat of arms

- Location of Henau within Rhein-Hunsrück-Kreis district
- Interactive map of Henau
- Location within Germany Location within Rhineland-Palatinate
- Coordinates: 49°52′09″N 7°29′59″E
- Country: Germany
- State: Rhineland-Palatinate
- District: Rhein-Hunsrück-Kreis
- Municipal assoc.: Kirchberg

Government
  - Mayor (2020–24): Reinhard Lanz

Area
  - Total: 6.69 km^{2} (2.58 sq mi)
- Elevation: 400 m (1,300 ft)

Population (2025-12-31)
  - Total: 166
  - Density: 24.8/km^{2} (64.3/sq mi)
- Time zone: UTC+01:00 (CET)
  - Summer (DST): UTC+02:00 (CEST)
- Postal codes: 55490
- Dialling codes: 06765
- Vehicle registration: SIM

Henau (German pronunciation: [ˈheːnaʊ]) is an Ortsgemeinde – a municipality belonging to a Verbandsgemeinde, a kind of collective municipality – in the Rhein-Hunsrück-Kreis (district) in Rhineland-Palatinate, Germany. It belongs to the Verbandsgemeinde of Kirchberg, whose seat is in the like-named town.

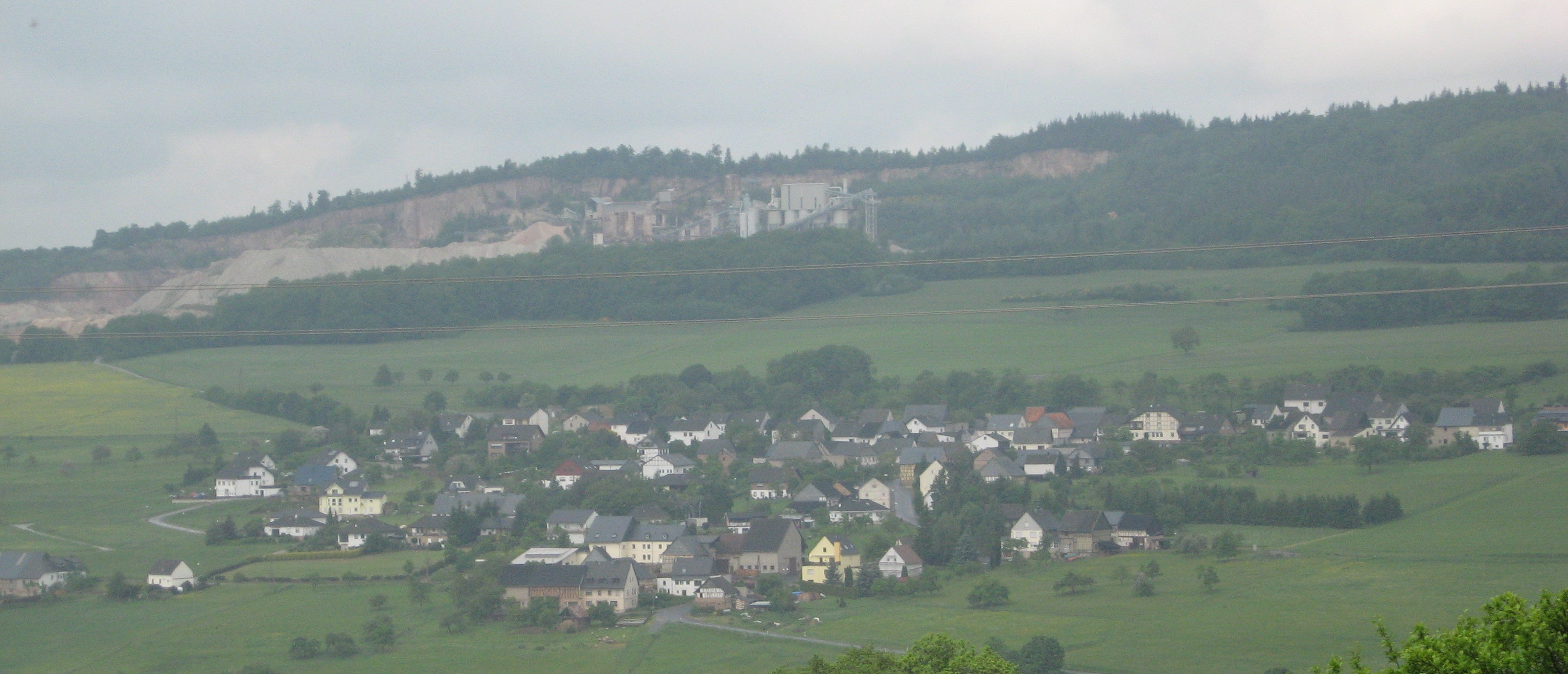
View from Schwarzerden

== Geography ==
=== Location ===
The municipality lies on the western edge of the Soonwald, a heavily wooded section of the west-central Hunsrück, at an elevation of 400 m above sea level, above the Kellenbach.

== History ==
Bearing witness to Henau's very early history are a stone hammer and a loom weight unearthed within the municipality's limits. These are now kept at the Hunsrückmuseum in Simmern.

In 1316, Henau had its first documentary mention in a document from Count Simon II of Sponheim. The Koppenstein Castle ruin, found within the municipality's limits, held town rights beginning in 1330, but had fallen into disrepair by the 16th century. Beginning in 1794, Henau lay under French rule. In 1815 it was assigned to the Kingdom of Prussia at the Congress of Vienna. Since 1946, it has been part of the then newly founded state of Rhineland-Palatinate.

== Politics ==
=== Municipal council ===
The council is made up of 6 council members, who were elected at the municipal election held in 2019

=== Mayor ===
Henau's mayor is Reinhard Lanz, installed in November 2020.

=== Coat of arms ===
The German blazon reads: In geteiltem Schild oben in Grün ein schreitender, herschauender, rotbewehrter silberner Löwe (= schreitender Leopard), unten blau-golden geschacht, belegt mit einer silbernen Schnalle, besetzt mit roten Edelsteinen.

The municipality's arms might in English heraldic language be described thus: Per fess, vert a lion passant guardant argent armed and langued gules and chequy azure and Or an arming buckle of the second studded of the third.

The lion (Löwe) is perhaps somewhat confusingly also called a leopard in the German blazon. This confusion also arises in English heraldry, with “leopard” often being the word used in earlier times for a cat charge in this particular attitude, namely “passant” (that is, striding along). James Parker, though, holds that “lion” was the usual term for both in later times, and that practically the same creature was meant, anyway. Whichever the cat is meant to be, the charge is drawn from the arms once borne by the Knights of Steinkallenfels, who were as early as the 12th century the lords of the Kellenbach high court and held lands in Henau, which itself was part of the high court's territory. The cat also recalls the Knights of Kellenbach, who were among the Steinkallenfelses’ descendants, and in the 13th century, were also part-owners of the Kellenbach high court. The “chequy” pattern below the line of partition refers to the Counts of Sponheim. It was they who held Koppenstein Castle, now within Henau's municipal limits, and they also held a share of the Kellenbach court. The buckle stands for yet another knightly family, the Knights of Schmidtburg, who were likewise part-owners of the Kellenbach high court, and who later also came into ownership of Koppenstein Castle.

== Culture and sightseeing ==
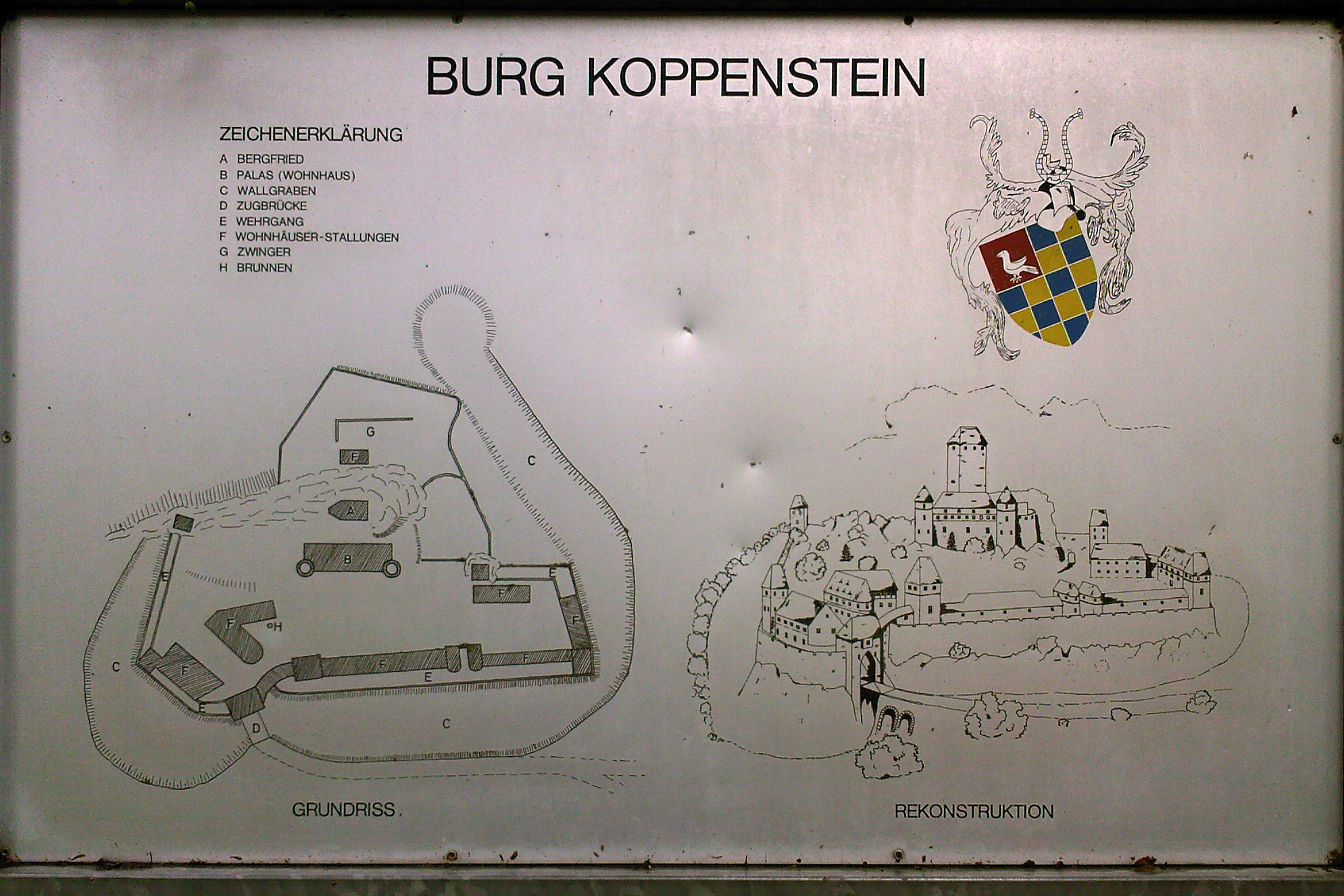
Koppenstein Castle ruin (plan and reconstruction)

=== Buildings ===
The following are listed buildings or sites in Rhineland-Palatinate’s Directory of Cultural Monuments:

- Hauptstraße, on the village's outskirts – water cistern; hexagonal quarrystone building, battlements, marked 1924
- Soonwaldstraße 1 – timber-frame double house, sided, 19th century
- Koppenstein Castle ruin, northeast of Henau on a wooded mountain ridge – founding in 10th century (?); upper castle with five-sided keep, latter half of the 13th century; bailey, south, east and north sides girded by doubled ringwall, entrance in the south, beneath the keep remnants of the lodgings, rectangular building with corner turrets

== Economy and infrastructure ==
The once dominant form of agriculture has all but disappeared, and one large company works almost all farmlands. Above the village is a big quartzite stripmine.
