= Tiefenbach, Rhineland-Palatinate =

Tiefenbach
- Municipality
- Coat of arms

- Location of Tiefenbach within Rhein-Hunsrück-Kreis district
- Interactive map of Tiefenbach
- Location within Germany Location within Rhineland-Palatinate
- Coordinates: 49°56′17″N 7°32′44″E
- Country: Germany
- State: Rhineland-Palatinate
- District: Rhein-Hunsrück-Kreis
- Municipal assoc.: Simmern-Rheinböllen

Government
  - Mayor (2019–24): Thorsten Fuchs

Area
  - Total: 5.79 km^{2} (2.24 sq mi)
- Elevation: 361 m (1,184 ft)

Population (2025-12-31)
  - Total: 768
  - Density: 133/km^{2} (344/sq mi)
- Time zone: UTC+01:00 (CET)
  - Summer (DST): UTC+02:00 (CEST)
- Postal codes: 55471
- Dialling codes: 06761
- Vehicle registration: SIM

Tiefenbach (German pronunciation: [ˈtiːfn̩bax]) is an Ortsgemeinde – a municipality belonging to a Verbandsgemeinde, a kind of collective municipality – in the Rhein-Hunsrück-Kreis (district) in Rhineland-Palatinate, Germany. It belongs to the Verbandsgemeinde Simmern-Rheinböllen, whose seat is in Simmern. Today's Tiefenbach grew together from two centres named Untertiefenbach and Obertiefenbach.

== Geography ==
=== Location ===
The municipality lies in the Hunsrück roughly 5 km south of Simmern and 9 km east of Kirchberg. To the east and south lies the Soonwald, a heavily wooded section of the west-central Hunsrück.

== History ==
Tiefenbach's early history is linked with the Wildburg (castle), which had its first documentary mention in 1253. Later, Tiefenbach, which lay at the northern foot of the Soonwald, was part of Palatinate-Simmern, which in 1556 introduced the Reformation. In 1673, the village passed to the Electorate of the Palatinate. Beginning in 1794, Tiefenbach lay under French rule. In 1815 it was assigned to the Kingdom of Prussia at the Congress of Vienna. In 1912, a Catholic chapel was built. After the First World War, the village was once again occupied by the French for a time. In the 1930s, the local ore mine, "Märkerei", was shut down. Since 1946, Tiefenbach has been part of the then newly founded state of Rhineland-Palatinate. In 1961, the Evangelical church was built.

In 1921, Tiefenbach was linked to the railway network, complete with a station. This line, running between Simmern and Gemünden, was abandoned in 1963; by 1965, all the tracks had been torn up. Until 2006, there was still a viaduct on the former line, but this had by then fallen into such disrepair that it was decided to demolish it with explosives. The old railway embankment northeast of Tiefenbach has, however, been preserved. The last road underpass on this embankment was demolished in 2009.

== Politics ==
=== Municipal council ===
The council is made up of 12 council members, who were elected by proportional representation at the municipal election held on 7 June 2009, and the honorary mayor as chairman.

The municipal election held on 7 June 2009 yielded the following results:

	FWG Tiefenbach	WG Vogler	other	Total
2009	8	4	-	12 seats
2004	-	-	12	12 seats

=== Mayor ===
Tiefenbach's mayor is Thorsten Fuchs.

=== Coat of arms ===
The municipality's arms might be described thus: A closet and an endorse, couped at the upper end at the closet, Or between, in dexter, sable an arming buckle argent and in sinister sable a lion rampant of the first armed and langued gules, in chief bendy lozengy of the third and azure with a hammer and pick per saltire to dexter of the second.

The top of the escutcheon bears the "bendy lozengy" pattern (that is, slanted diamonds) once also borne by the Electorate of the Palatinate. This is charged with a hammer and pick, which stand for the iron mining formerly done here. The Palatine Lion on the sinister (armsbearer's left, viewer's right) side is likewise a reference to the village's former allegiance to the Electorate of the Palatinate. The silver buckle on the dexter (armsbearer's right, viewer's left) side stands for the Barons of Schmidtburg, waldgraves who had several holdings in the village.

The arms have been borne since 22 September 1980.

== Culture and sightseeing ==
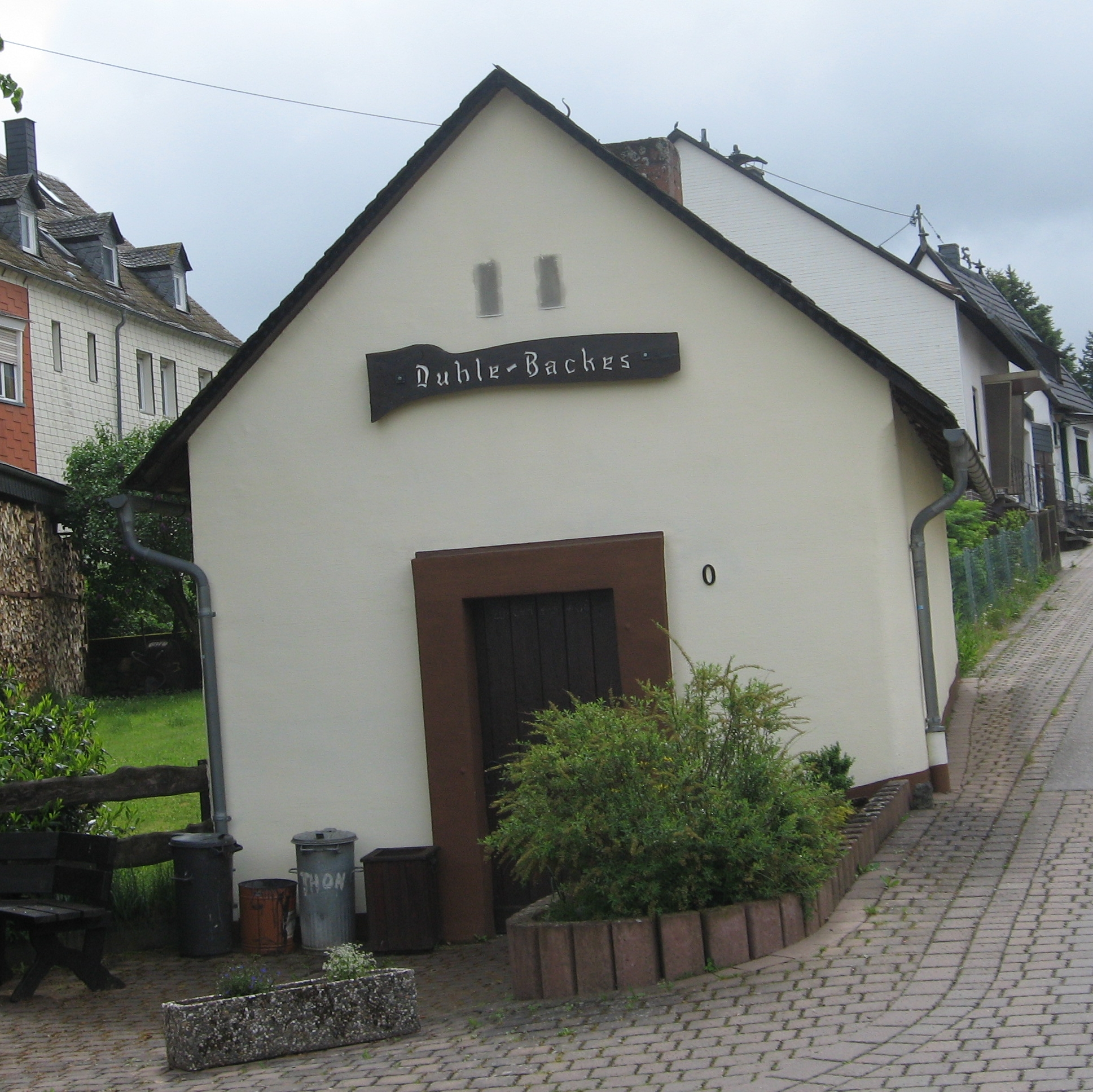
Hauptstraße: bakehouse

=== Buildings ===
The following are listed buildings or sites in Rhineland-Palatinate's Directory of Cultural Monuments:

- Hauptstraße – bakehouse (Duhle Backes), one-floor plastered building, 19th century
- Hauptstraße 9 – timber-frame house, partly solid or slated, 19th century
- Hauptstraße 10 – timber-frame house, half-hipped roof, first third of the 19th century
- Hauptstraße 28 – estate complex along the street; timber-frame, partly solid or slated, latter half of the 19th century, timber-frame barn, partly solid, late 19th century

Tiefenbach also has two churches, a Madonna figure standing on the slope, an old ore mine and the Wildburg (castle).

=== Village life ===
The Wildburghalle was built in 1988 as a multipurpose hall. Several clubs, among them the sport club, a motor sport club and the volunteer fire brigade, shape social and cultural life in the village. Also, there is an Evangelical kindergarten.

== Economy and infrastructure ==
=== Tourism ===
The Schinderhannes-Soonwald-Radweg (cycle path) from Gemünden to Simmern runs through the village. Farther away is the newly blazed Soonwaldsteig hiking trail.

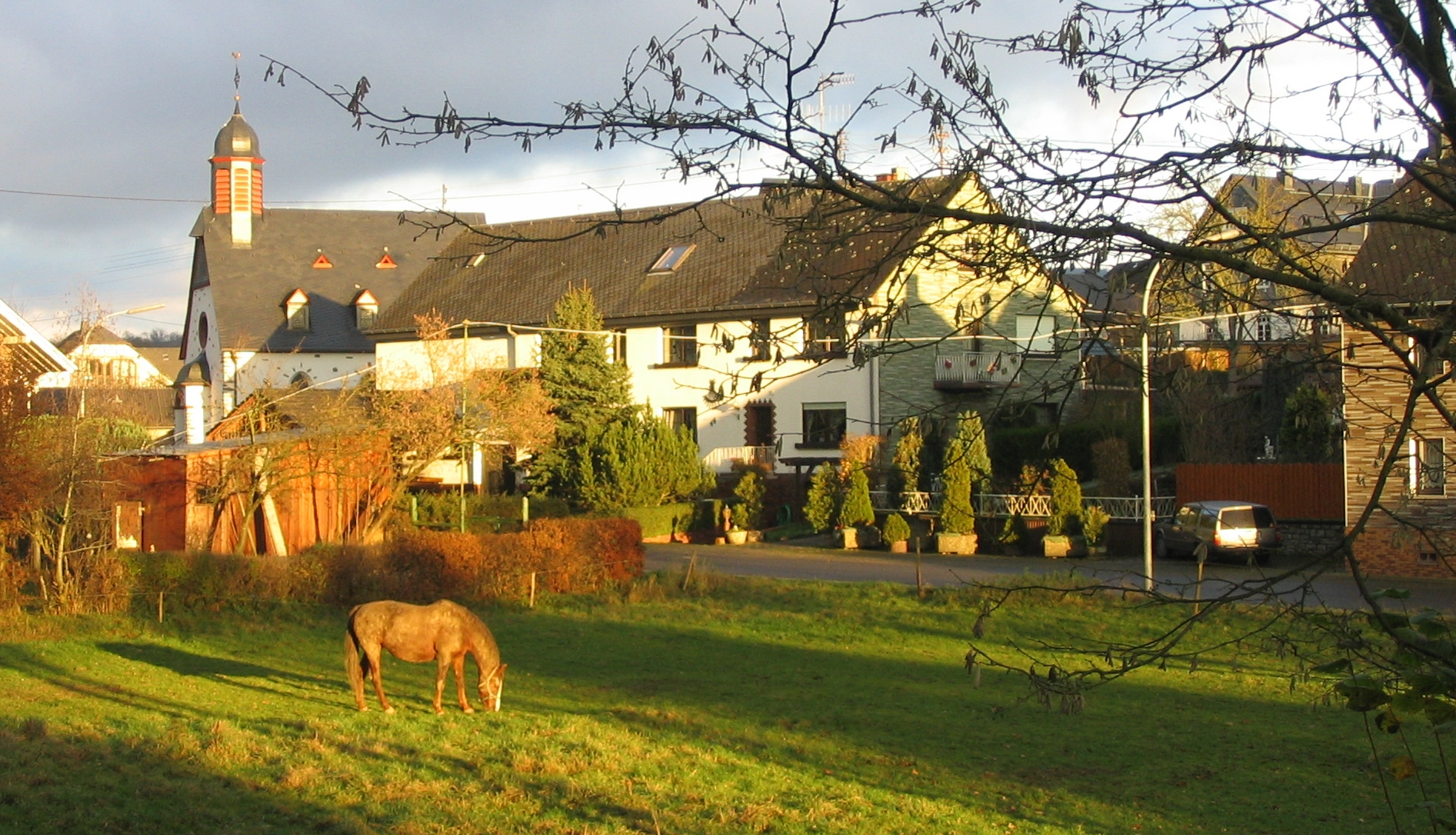
Village centre on the Brühlbach

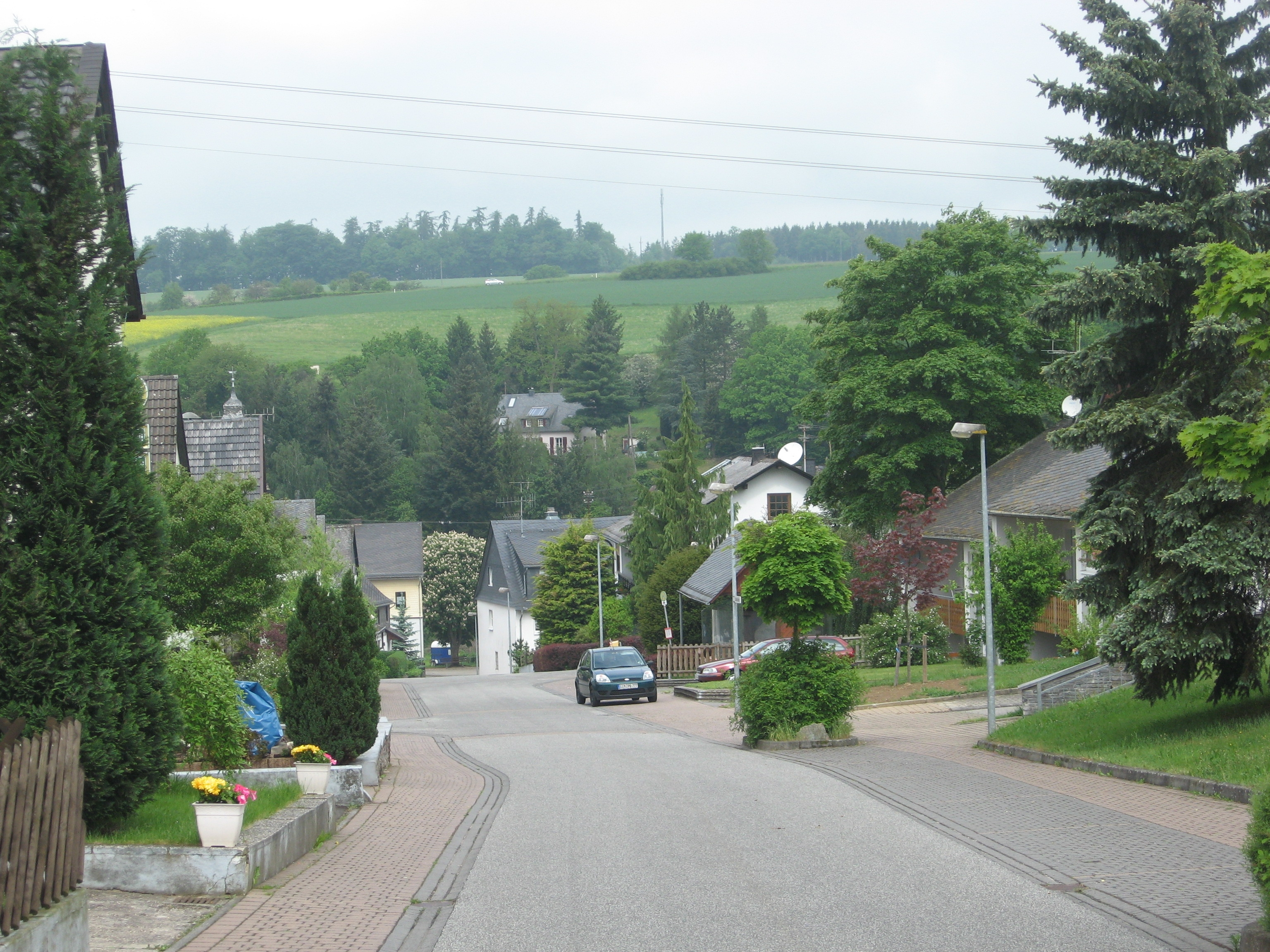
Dorfstraße

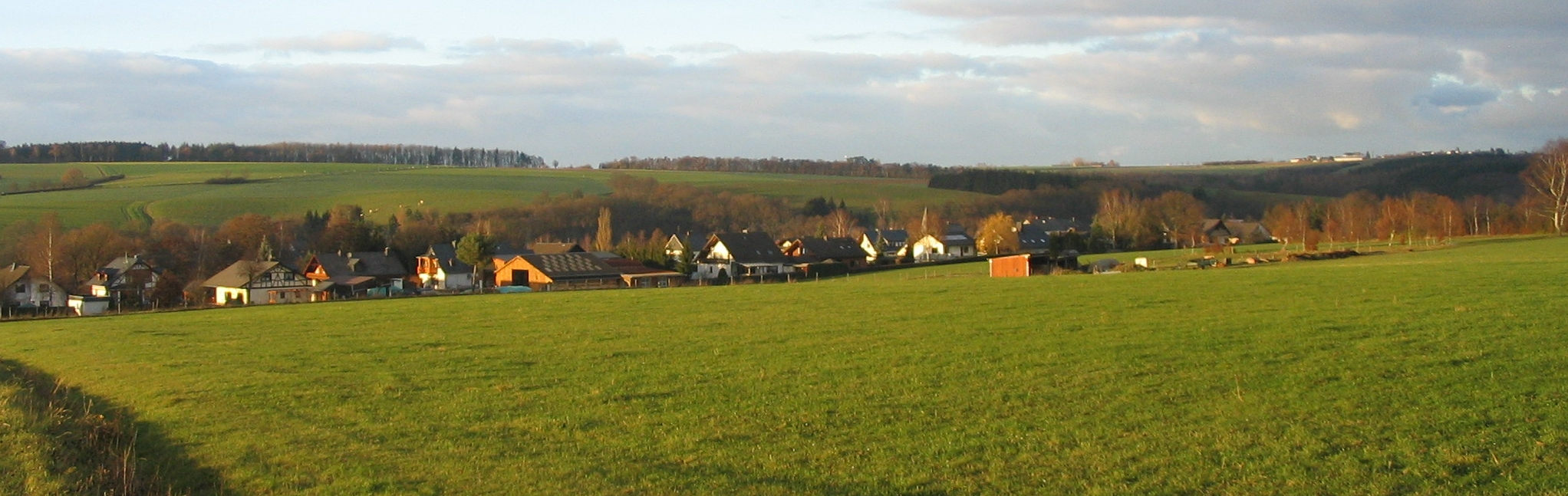
View from the Soonwald

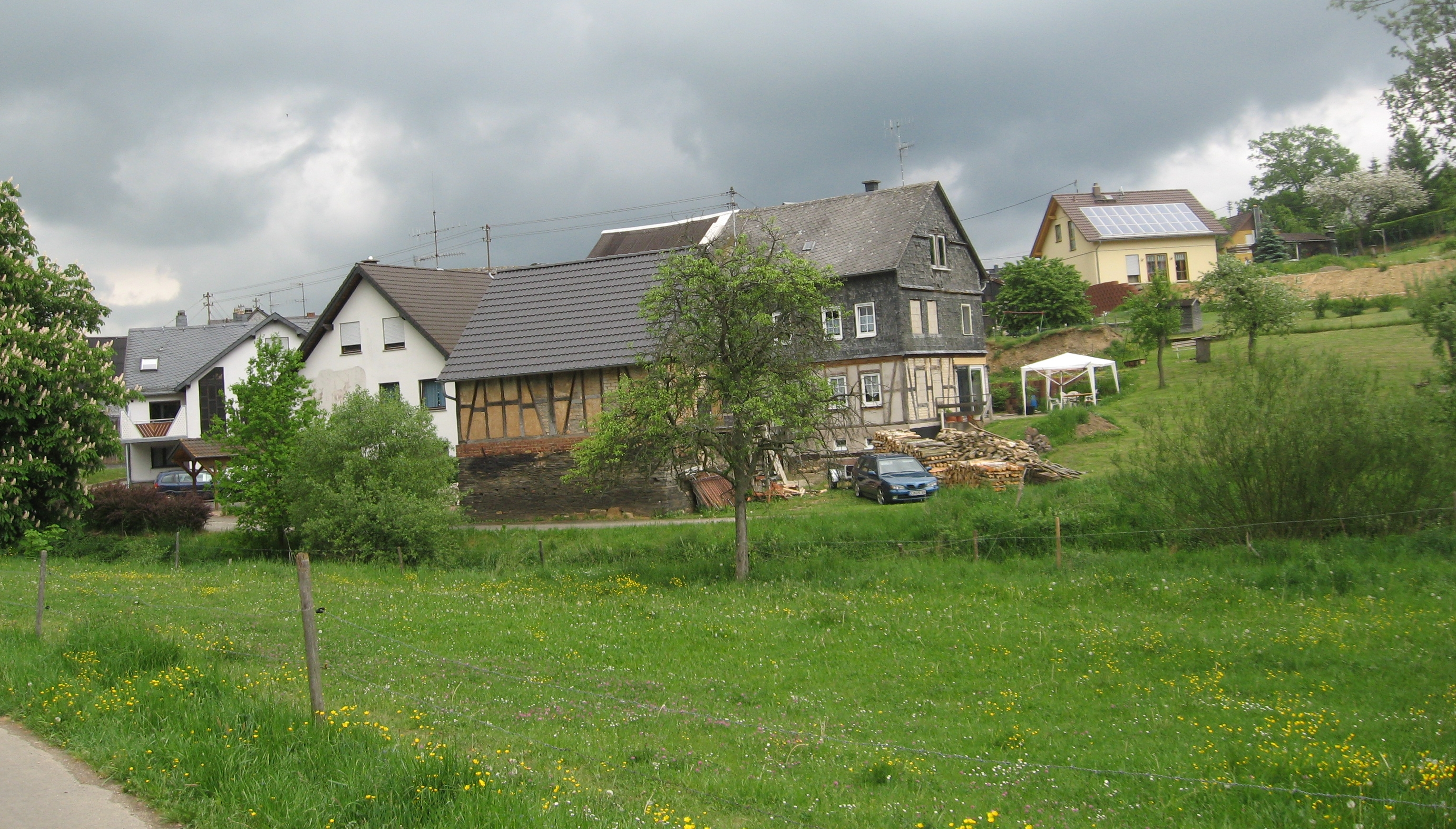
Impressions on the village outskirts
