= Sargenroth =

- Municipality
- Coat of arms

- Location of Sargenroth within Rhein-Hunsrück-Kreis district
- Interactive map of Sargenroth
- Location within Germany Location within Rhineland-Palatinate
- Coordinates: 49°55′56″N 7°30′54″E
- Country: Germany
- State: Rhineland-Palatinate
- District: Rhein-Hunsrück-Kreis
- Municipal assoc.: Simmern-Rheinböllen

Government
  - Mayor (2019–24): Gerd Martin

Area
  - Total: 12.71 km^{2} (4.91 sq mi)
- Elevation: 410 m (1,350 ft)

Population (2025-12-31)
  - Total: 442
  - Density: 34.8/km^{2} (90.1/sq mi)
- Time zone: UTC+01:00 (CET)
  - Summer (DST): UTC+02:00 (CEST)
- Postal codes: 55471
- Dialling codes: 06761
- Vehicle registration: SIM
- Website: www.sargenroth.de

Sargenroth is an Ortsgemeinde – a municipality belonging to a Verbandsgemeinde, a kind of collective municipality – in the Rhein-Hunsrück-Kreis (district) in Rhineland-Palatinate, Germany. It belongs to the Verbandsgemeinde Simmern-Rheinböllen, whose seat is in Simmern.

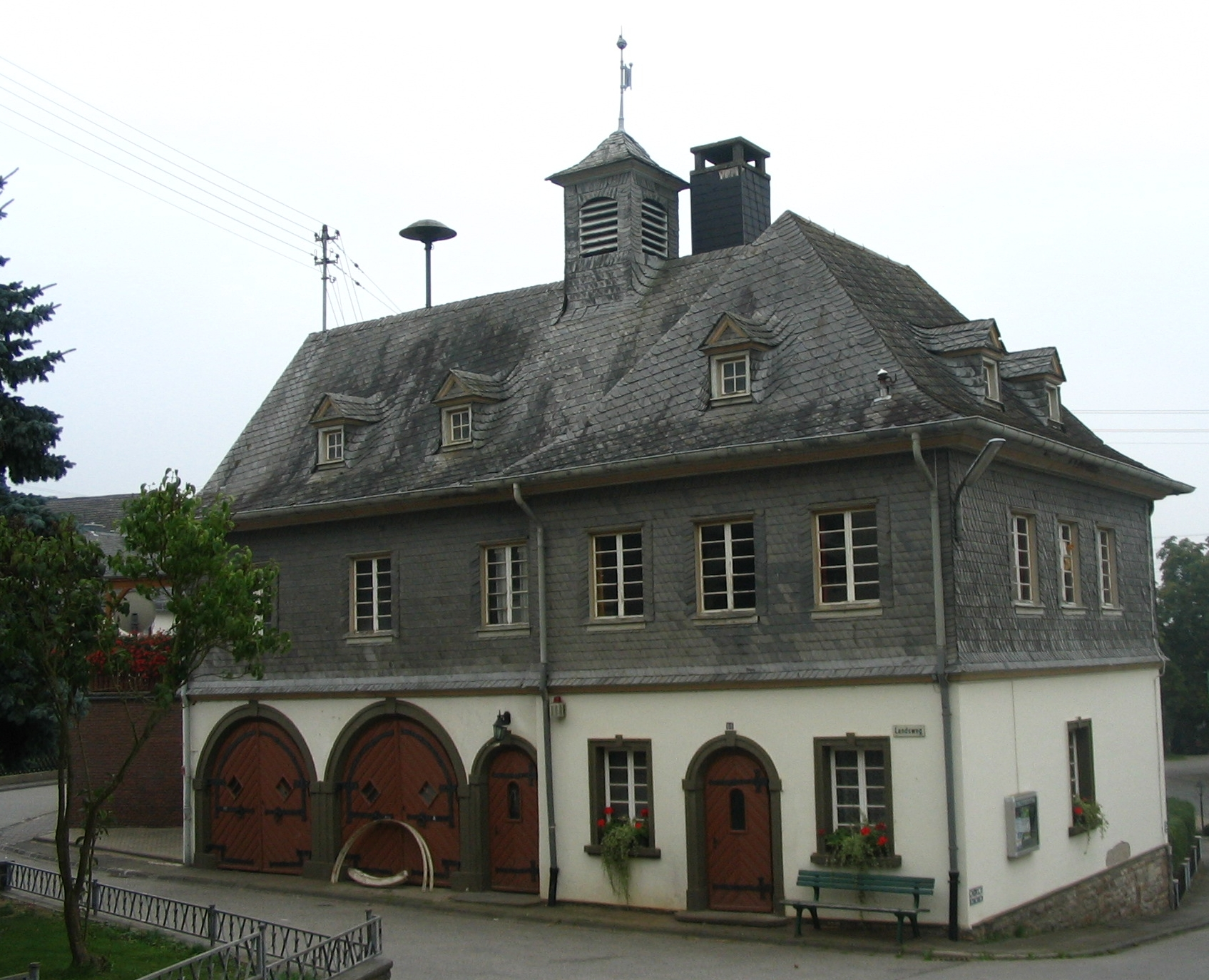
Historical municipal centre in the Lower Village

== Geography ==
=== Location ===
The municipality lies in the central Hunsrück, between the Simmerbach valley and the Soonwald, a heavily wooded section of the west-central Hunsrück, roughly 8 km east of Kirchberg and 5 km south of Simmern. Sargenroth's highest elevation is the Wildburghöhe, 629 m above sea level.

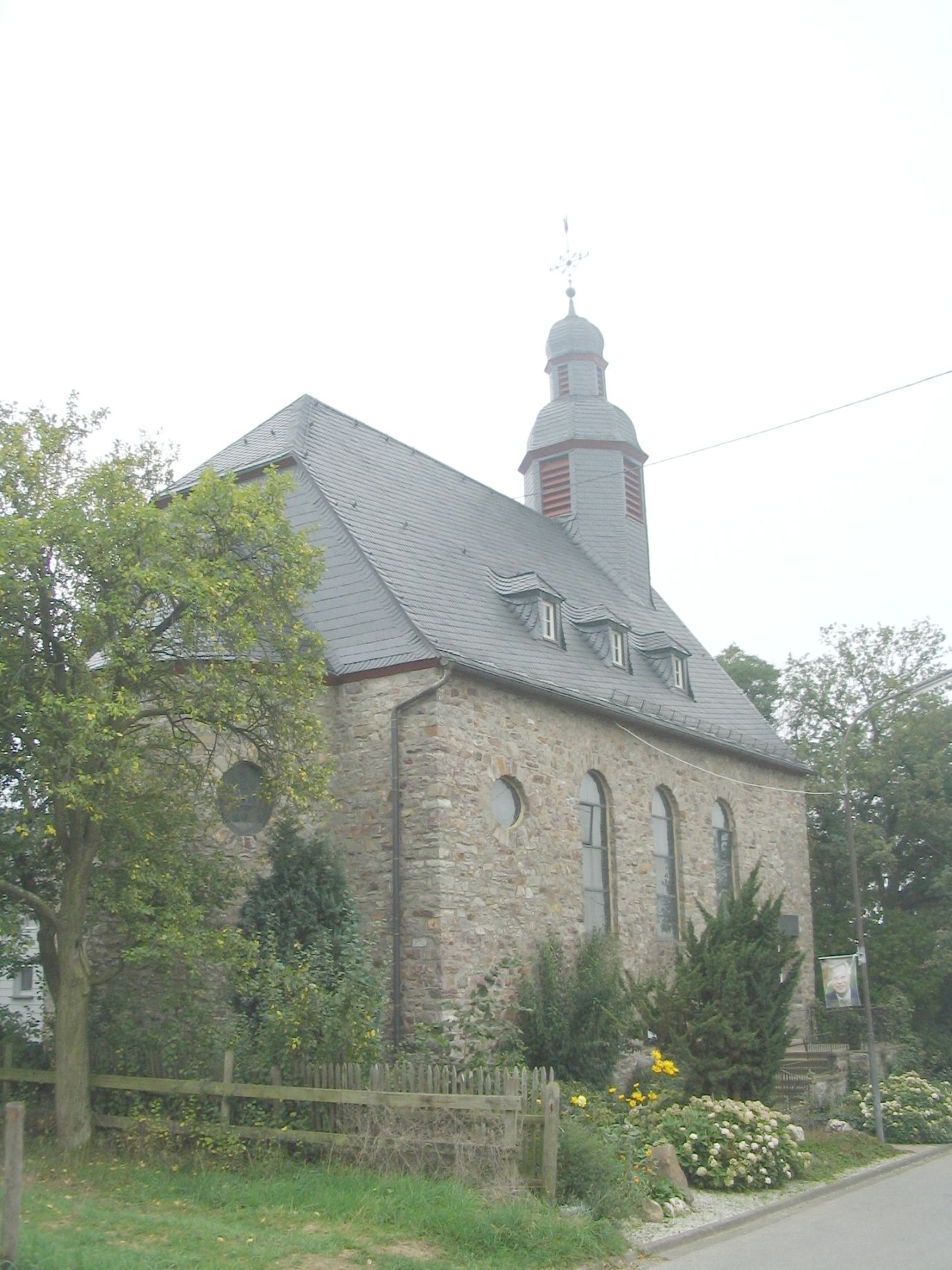
Catholic chapel in the Upper Village

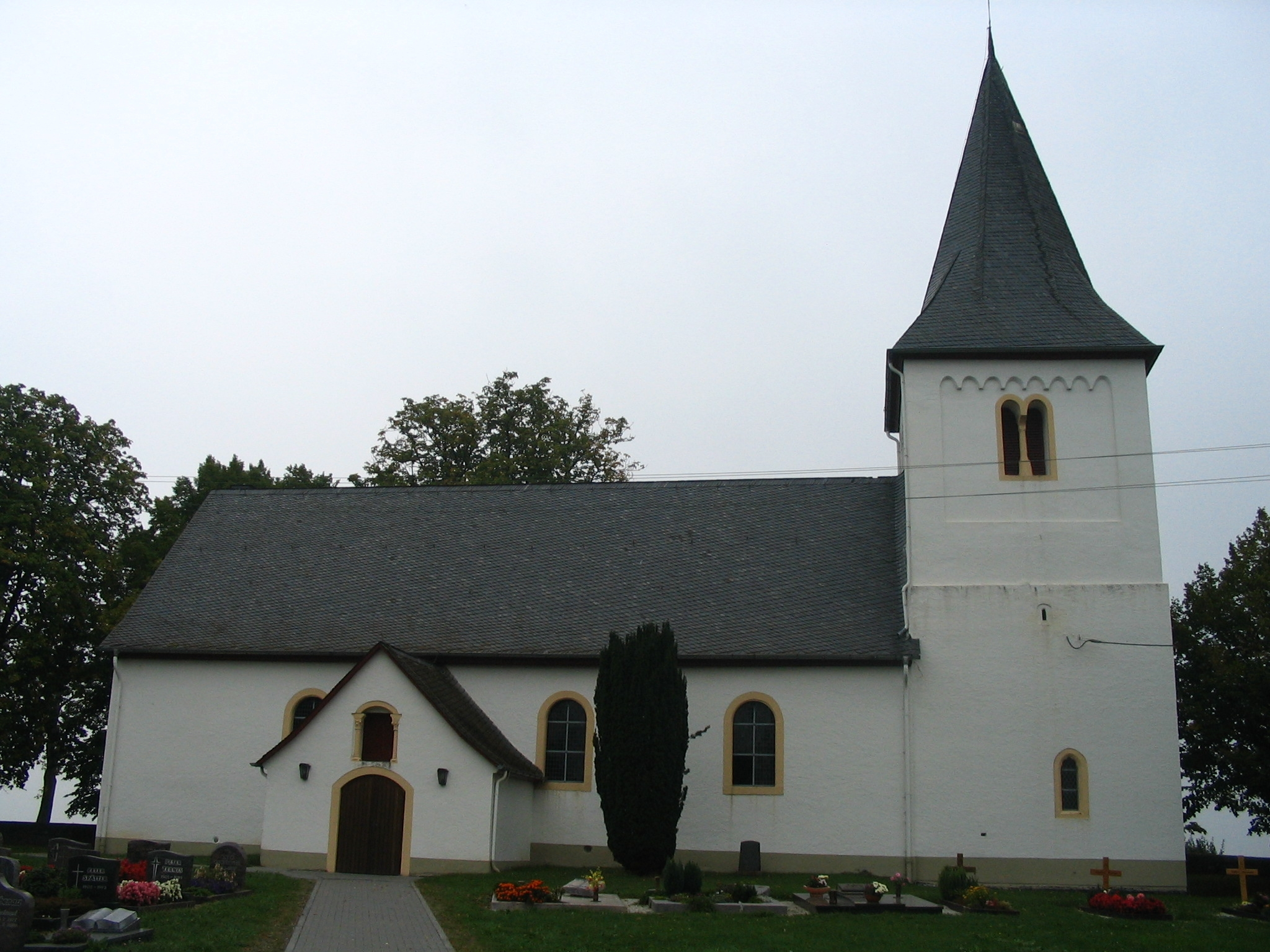
Nunkirche (Evangelical church)

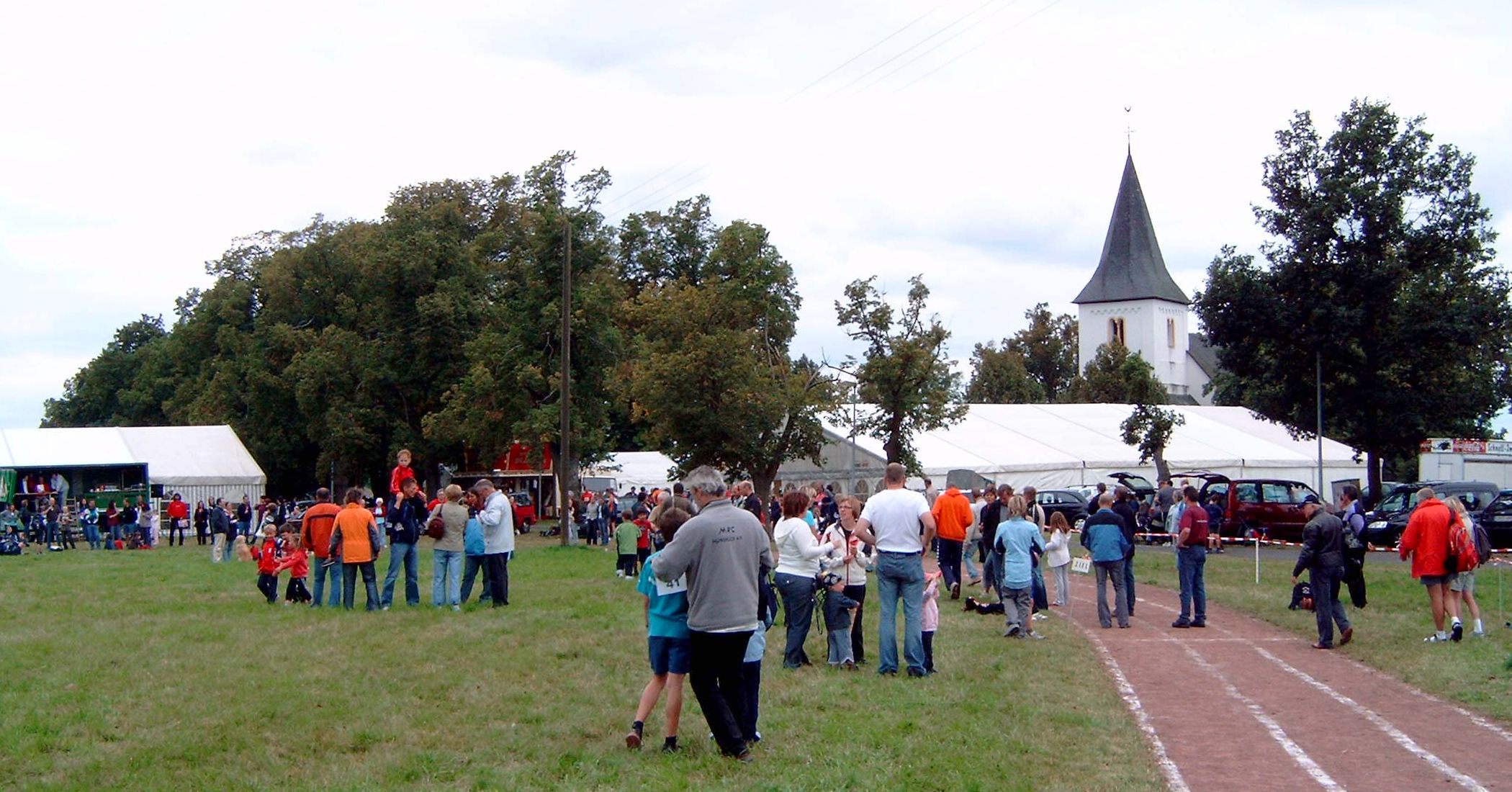
Gau Bergfest at the Nunkirche, 2007

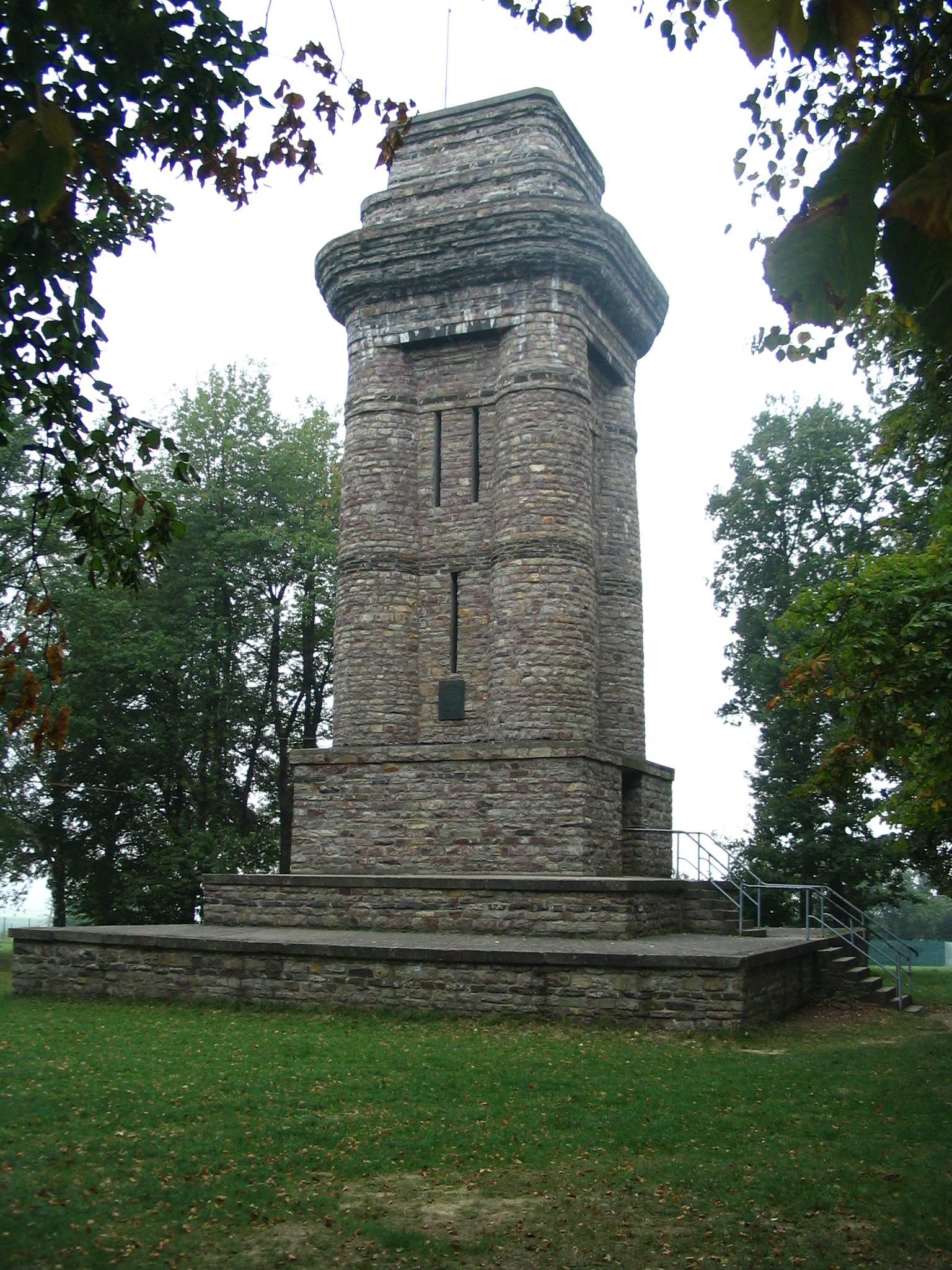
Bismarck Tower east of Rochusfeld and the Nunkirche

== Name ==
The placename ending —roth denotes the location of a clearing made for expanding fields or for settling. The name “Sargenroth” is recorded in the following spellings over the ages:

- 1276? – Sargenrucke
- 1346 – Sarchinreid
- 1442 – Sarchenrat
- 1464 – Sarchenraidt
- 1543 – Sarchenrat
- 1600 – Sarchertt
- 1608 – Sarchrot
- 1693 – Sarchenrath
- 1706 – Sargenroth

After 1706, the name was usually spelt with a G. The root word is the Old High German rod and the Middle High German rot, meaning a place made tillable by clearing, or simply a clearing. The qualifier Sargen— might well go back to somebody named Saricho. Thus, the name would originally have meant “Saricho’s Clearing”.

There is a further idea, propounded by several people named at the source given here, that the name might once have been associated with a convent.

== History ==
On 18 May 1276, Sargenroth had its first documented mention when Pope Innocent V confirmed Tholey Abbey’s holdings. These were already known to be myriad, but had been confined to the Abbey’s immediate area, Hermeskeil and Baumholder. However, following this document, outlying holdings were noted, among them Sargenroth. The document mentions “lands in the village of Sargenhrucha”. Further documented mentions are as follows:

- 27 October 1346 – Sir Friedrich Valysen of Leyen was enfeoffed by Archbishop Baldwin with the tithes from Simmern, including those from Sarchenraid.
- About 1400 – The tithes from Simmern also included Sarchenroth.
- 5 March 1550 – The Archbishop of Mainz had the parish of Sargenrot visited.
- 1600 – The description of the villages under the Ravengiersburg provost's authority named Sarchert.
- 3 July 1728 – The inspector's acts named the village Sarchenroth.

Beginning in 1750, the current spelling became commonplace in the church books.

The village belonged in the Middle Ages to the court district of the Nunkirch (church), and was thereby under the Ravengiersburg provost's authority. In 1408, the Ravengiersburg holdings passed along with Sargenroth to the Counts Palatine, and then in 1410 to the newly created Duchy of Simmern, which in 1566 introduced the Reformation. In 1673, the village passed back to Electoral Palatinate. Beginning in 1794, Sargenroth lay under French rule. In 1814 it was assigned to the Kingdom of Prussia at the Congress of Vienna. Since 1946, it has been part of the then newly founded state of Rhineland-Palatinate.

== Politics ==
=== Municipal council ===
The council is composed of eight council members, who were elected by majority vote at the municipal election held on 7 June 2009, and the honorary mayor as chairman.

=== Mayor ===
Sargenroth's mayor is Benjamin Zilles.

=== Coat of arms ===
The German blazon reads: Schild durch goldene linke Schrägleiste geteilt; oben in Schwarz schreitender, goldener Löwe, unten goldener Balken in Schwarz.

The municipality's arms might in English heraldic language be described thus: "Sable a bendlet sinister Or between a lion rampant sinister of the second armed and langued gules and a fess of the second couped at the bendlet sinister".

Sargenroth lay in the Ravengiersburg provost's area of authority. The gold lion refers to the Dukes of Simmern and the Counts Palatine of the Rhine, who were the Vögte and the landholders. Duke George of Simmern secularized the monastery. Beginning in the 18th century, the Schultheißerei of Ravengiersburg-Sargenroth bore the lion as a charge in its seal. The gold fess (horizontal stripe) on the black field is the arms once borne by the Barons of Wiltberg, the owners of the Wildburg (castle) in the Soonwald (within Sargenroth's limits). In 1486, they sold their last holding to Count Palatine John I of Simmern.

The arms have been borne since 9 September 1976.

== Culture and sightseeing ==
=== Buildings ===
The following are listed buildings or sites in Rhineland-Palatinate’s Directory of Cultural Monuments:

- Evangelical parish church, Hauptstraße 66, north of Sargenroth on the Rochusfeld – so-called Nunkirche; quire tower and parts of the nave wall, 12th century, conversion and extension 1745; whole complex of buildings with graveyard
- Bismarckturm (“Bismarck Tower”) – quarrystone building with round pillars, about 1900
- Wildburg castle ruin – keep, possibly 13th or 14th century; lower part of the yard with wall
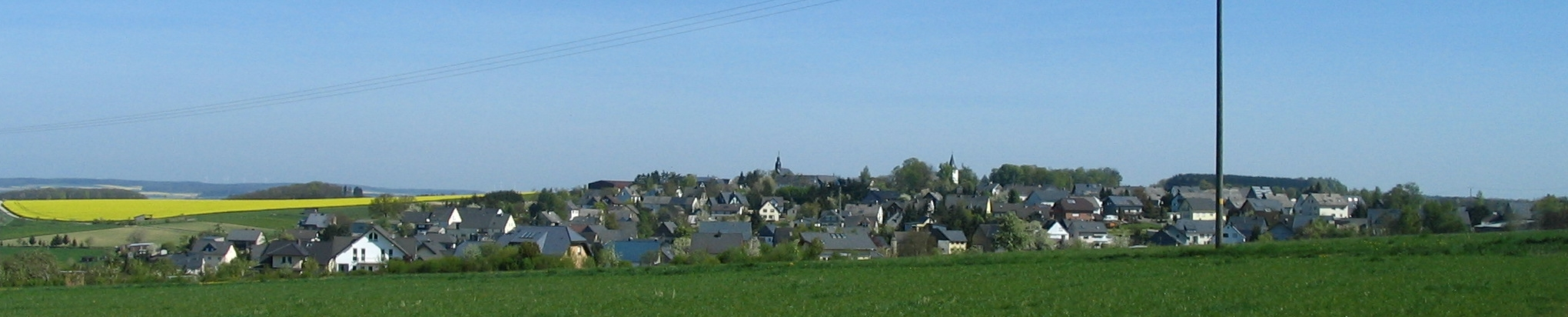
Panorama of Sargenroth from the west

=== Regular events ===
The Rochusfeld, covered with rare orchids, between the Nunkirche and the Bismarck Tower, is where the traditional Nunkircher Markt (market) is held each September. On the Sunday before the market, there is also a festival, the Gau Bergfest, staged by the Turngau Hunsrück (regional organization of the German Gymnastic Association).

== Economy and infrastructure ==
=== Tourism ===
There is a youth hostel in Sargenroth. The Schinderhannes-Soonwald-Radweg (cycle path) runs between the village and the Soonwald.
