= Winterbach, Bad Kreuznach =

Winterbach
- Municipality
- Coat of arms

- Location of Winterbach within Bad Kreuznach district
- Interactive map of Winterbach
- Location within Germany Location within Rhineland-Palatinate
- Coordinates: 49°52′31.69″N 7°38′10.55″E
- Country: Germany
- State: Rhineland-Palatinate
- District: Bad Kreuznach
- Municipal assoc.: Rüdesheim

Government
  - Mayor (2019–24): Werner Rebenich

Area
  - Total: 14.74 km^{2} (5.69 sq mi)
- Elevation: 355 m (1,165 ft)

Population (2025-12-31)
  - Total: 491
  - Density: 33.3/km^{2} (86.3/sq mi)
- Time zone: UTC+01:00 (CET)
  - Summer (DST): UTC+02:00 (CEST)
- Postal codes: 55595
- Dialling codes: 06756
- Vehicle registration: KH
- Website: winterbachsoonwald.de

Winterbach (German pronunciation: [ˈvɪntɐbax]) is a municipality in the district of Bad Kreuznach in Rhineland-Palatinate, in western Germany. It belongs to the Rüdesheim association. Winterbach is also a state-approved resort.

== Geography ==
Winterbach is located in the southern Hunsrück, on the edge of the Soonwald at the 657 meter high Ellerspring. With 77.1 percent of the land area being wooded. The Ellerbach also flows through the village. Winterbach also includes the residences of Forsthaus Winterbach, Kreershäuschen and Kuhpferch.
