= Schnorbach =

- Municipality
- Coat of arms

- Location of Schnorbach within Rhein-Hunsrück-Kreis district
- Interactive map of Schnorbach
- Location within Germany Location within Rhineland-Palatinate
- Coordinates: 49°59′34″N 7°36′44″E
- Country: Germany
- State: Rhineland-Palatinate
- District: Rhein-Hunsrück-Kreis
- Municipal assoc.: Simmern-Rheinböllen

Government
  - Mayor (2019–24): Bernd Kunz

Area
  - Total: 3.42 km^{2} (1.32 sq mi)
- Elevation: 428 m (1,404 ft)

Population (2025-12-31)
  - Total: 262
  - Density: 76.6/km^{2} (198/sq mi)
- Time zone: UTC+01:00 (CET)
  - Summer (DST): UTC+02:00 (CEST)
- Postal codes: 55497
- Dialling codes: 06764
- Vehicle registration: SIM
- Website: www.schnorbach.de

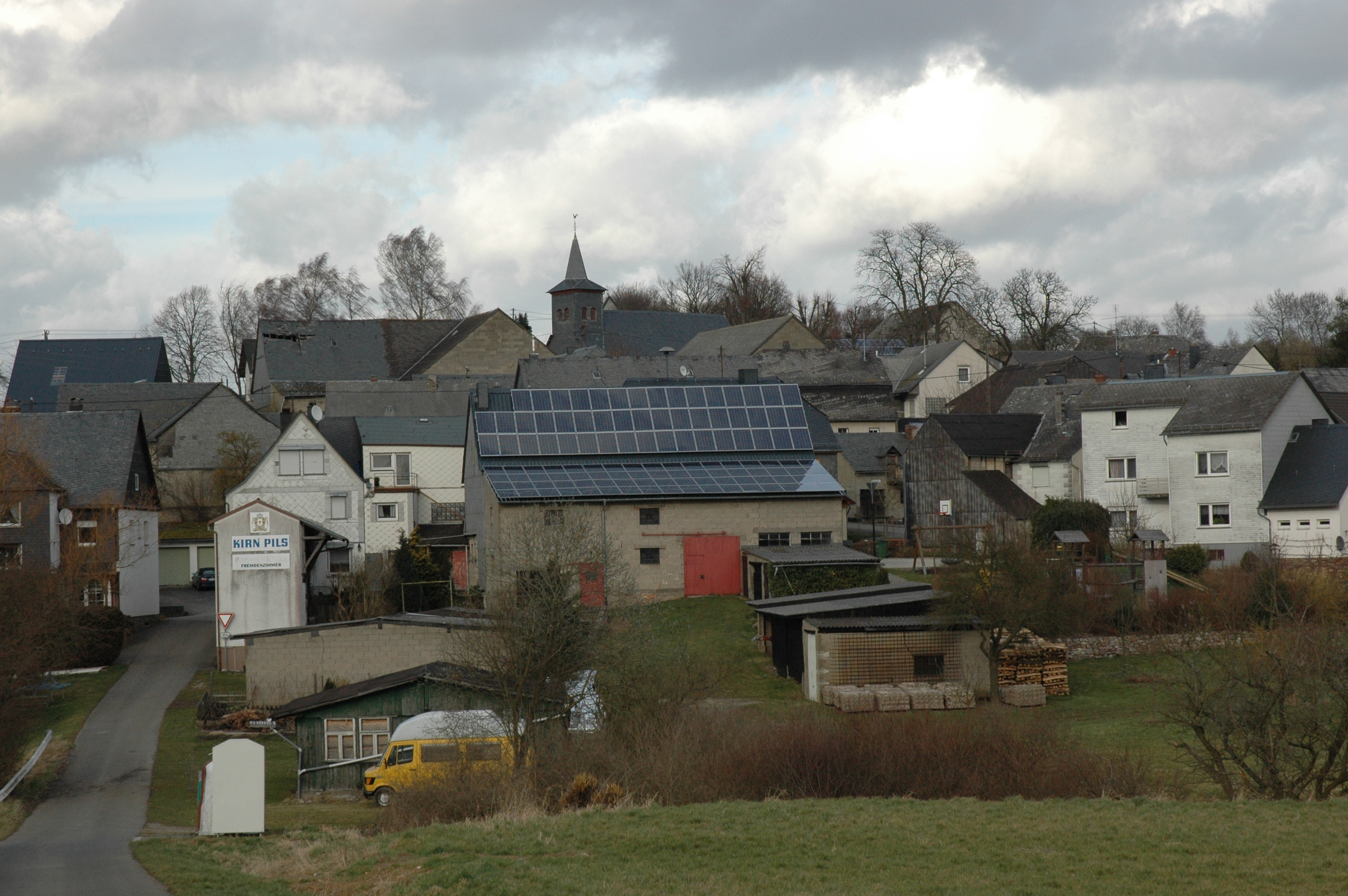
View from the south

Schnorbach is an Ortsgemeinde – a municipality belonging to a Verbandsgemeinde, a kind of collective municipality – in the Rhein-Hunsrück-Kreis (district) in Rhineland-Palatinate, Germany. It belongs to the administrative unit Simmern-Rheinböllen, whose seat is in Simmern.

== Geography ==
=== Location ===
The municipality lies in a hollow north of the Soonwald – a heavily wooded section of the west-central Hunsrück – and Bundesstraße 50, halfway between Simmern to the west and Rheinböllen to the east, with each roughly 5 km (3 mi) away. The municipal area measures 342 ha, of which roughly 81 ha is wooded and 230 ha is given over to agriculture.

== History ==
About 1200, Schnorbach had its first documentary mention. A bronze axe from the Tumulus culture (about 1000 BC), however, bears witness to earlier human habitation.

In 1006, the church at Mörschbach built by the nobleman Thidrich was consecrated by Archbishop of Mainz Willigis and the tithing district was defined. From the Rinkenbach (brook) between Altweidelbach and Mutterschied to point 466.8 southeast of Mörschbach the boundary ran along the old stone road (a Roman road). The tithing district between this stone road and the Simmerbach may have been an old holding of the Lords of Wahlbach, who were related to the Lords of Braunshorn and the Lords of Dick near Grevenbroich, who founded the Cistercian convent of Kumbd.

South of this stone road near Schnorbach, the Counts of Kessel had holdings. This noble house appeared with Count Bruno in 1081, then holding a county in what is now the Netherlands on the Meuse's left bank between Roermond and Venlo. The Vogtei over the Benedictine Saint Pantaleon's Abbey in Cologne was in their hands as an hereditary fief. Conrad (about 1188) and Hermann (1235–1255), both Counts of Kessel, were its abbots. Beginning in the mid 12th century, the Counts of Kessel also called themselves the Lords of Grevenbroich.

The relation to the Cologne church suggests a link through Bacharach into the Hunsrück, for Bacharach had already been a Cologne holding since Archbishop Kunibert's time (626-648). This is a parallel appearance to the Lords of Dick, who came to the Kumbd area by way of Stahleck Castle, in Bacharach. The Counts of Kessel also had holdings on the Moselle, having been enfeoffed with them by the Archbishopric of Cologne. These were further granted in fief to the Lords of Braunshorn, although in 1184, under Archbishop Philip of Heinsberg, these were returned to the Cologne church. The Lords of Braunshorn received as compensation for this a benefit from the Cologne-owned vineyards at Bacharach. From Bacharach, the Counts of Kessel could have acquired Schnorbach as an Imperial holding, particularly as the former Imperial holding of Argenthal can be found right nearby.

Count Palatine Rudolf I (1294–1319), who had given his bride as a wedding present 10,000 Marks at Fürstenberg Castle and Castle Stahlberg near Steeg (today an outlying centre of Bacharach), Kaub and a few other Palatine holdings, ended up at odds with the Count of Kessel over the holdings on the Middle Rhine and in the Hunsrück. On 29 September 1295, Walram, then still the Cathedral Provost at Münster, empowered his notary Theoderich to settle the dispute with the Count Palatine, which had arisen when the Count Palatine had taken ownership of Kessel holdings at Steeg, and also the villages of Schnorbach and Ebschied along with their attendant forests and other appurtenances. The resulting agreement was ratified on 4 October of the same year by Walram of Kessel. In this agreement, he forwent his four vineyards and an arboretum at Steeg, and the villages of Schnorbach and Ebschied, against a payment of 86 Marks. At the same time, he also promised to make no further claims after he left the priesthood. Thus, Schnorbach passed into the Counts Palatine's hands. Walram also confirmed the legality of this agreement on 8 October 1296, after he had resigned as Cathedral Provost at Münster.

Schnorbach's first documentary mention was in a directory of holdings kept by the Benedictine Convent of Rupertsberg near Bingen, about 1200, when Pastor David of Schnorbach donated to the convent his own Hufen (an area of land). With the Count Palatine's acquisition of the village, he also received the patronage rights. Together with his brother Ludwig, he donated the rights to the Williamite Monastery of Windsbach or Fürstenthal near Bacharach in 1305. As this monastery never truly flourished, Rupert I, Elector Palatine began exercising the patronage rights over Schnorbach himself once again in 1368.

The original tithing district was considerably bigger than what later came to be Schnorbach's municipal area. In the north, the boundary ran along the old stone road. In Mutterschied’s municipal area, it seems to have reached the Rinkenbach. Here lay what in the 1614 tithe report was called “Herrenfeld” (“Lords’ Field”, but perhaps a corruption of Hirzenfeld, from Middle High German Hirz, meaning “hart”; the Modern High German word is Hirsch), from which, along with a few other fields, the parish drew two thirds of the tithes. The parish priest was also entitled to tithes in parts of Riesweiler, Argenthal, Altweidelbach, Wahlbach and Mörschbach. Within Altweidelbach's and Wahlbach's municipal areas, the lands on the side of the old stone road nearer Schnorbach were likely part of the tithing district, while in Mörschbach there was a triangular area bordered on two sides by the old stone road and on the other by the Paterbach.

Shares of the tithes in Schnorbach and Wahlbach were held in the 14th century by the Lords of Heinzenberg. In 1376, Johann of Heinzenberg bestowed these upon his wife, Irmgart, whose father was Friedrich of Ippelbrunn. This is likely the share that the Waldgraves granted Johann of Schönenburg about 1400, from whom it then passed to Emmerich and Wilhelm of Ingelheim. The latter sold it in 1446 to the Mörschbach parish priest for 625 Gulden.

According to the 1599 description from the Amt of Simmern, Schnorbach had 11 hearths, although two of these were in empty houses. The Unterschultheiß was Michel Hebel. The nuns of Rupertsberg exacted each year from all holdings 20 Malter of oats (Bingen measure) and 3 pounds of oats. At two fields, Electorate of the Palatinate was then entitled to the tithes, namely at a 34-Morgen field on the Simmerner Weg and at a 7-Morgen one called the “Schelmäcker” (from Middle High German schelme, meaning “carrion”, and the word Äcker, meaning “fields”, the whole meaning “fields for burying livestock carcasses”). This area may well have been on the road from Altweidelbach to Argenthal (Argenthal field 3, “Auf der Schinnkaul”), right at the municipal limit with Schnorbach and not within Mutterschied's area of jurisdiction, where the livestock burial ground lies, 500 m north of the village. This tithe was granted for 11 Malter of grain. The remaining tithe went to the parish priest.

Beginning in 1590, Mutterschied was held to be a branch parish of Schnorbach. In 1608, a new parochial authority was set up. The main part of the village's tithes went to the leadership of the Kumbd Convent, who at that time were paying the priests and the teachers their salaries. The priest had to tend to the Mutterschied branch every Sunday and Penance Day. On Good Friday, worshippers from Mutterschied had to come to Schnorbach.

The church consecrated to Saint Sebastian passed in the Kaub division of churches (1706) to the Catholics, who three years later built a new nave onto the older quire. Grouped into the area bishop's region was Argenthal with Ellern, Wahlbach, Altweidelbach, Glashütte and Thiergarten. On 7 September 1767, when Schnorbach was split away from the Glan rural chapter and assigned to the Kirn rural chapter, the village had 19 households, 118 communicants and 135 souls. The church had been newly built in 1732. Belonging to the rectory, built by the clerical estate administration, were a barn, stabling and a garden. As remuneration, the priest received 120 Gulden, 15 Malter of grain, 27 Malter of oats and 1 Fuder. Belonging to the clerical estate were 4½ Morgen of cropfields and 3 Morgen of meadowland. The schoolmaster, who had to teach classes in his own house, was paid 10 Gulden as recompense. His actual salary was 20 Gulden, 10 Malter of grain, 15 Gulden as “school money” and 2 Gulden as an ecclesiastical benefit. He was also spared levies to maintain livestock and the herdsman.

Beginning in 1794, Schnorbach lay under French rule. In 1814 it was assigned to the Kingdom of Prussia at the Congress of Vienna. Since 1946, it has been part of the then newly founded state of Rhineland-Palatinate.

== Religion ==
Schnorbach is, in Catholic terms, a parish seat, to which the municipalities of Argenthal, Ellern and Wahlbach are also tied. The parish church was built in the early 18th century. At 66% of the population, Catholics are the majority. The Evangelicals belong to the parish of Argenthal in the church district of Simmern-Trarbach.

=== Population development ===
What follows is a table of the municipality's population figures for selected years since the early 19th century (each time at 31 December):

Historical population

Year	Pop.	±%
1815	189	—
1835	202	+6.9%
1871	173	−14.4%
1905	196	+13.3%
1939	199	+1.5%
1950	238	+19.6%

Year	Pop.	±%
1961	227	−4.6%
1965	213	−6.2%
1970	215	+0.9%
1975	207	−3.7%
1980	196	−5.3%
1985	167	−14.8%

Year	Pop.	±%
1987	188	+12.6%
1990	173	−8.0%
1995	193	+11.6%
2000	231	+19.7%
2005	234	+1.3%
2006	237	+1.3%

Source: Statistisches Landesamt Rheinland-Pfalz

== Politics ==
=== Municipal council ===
The council is made up of 6 council members, who were elected by majority vote at the municipal election held on 7 June 2009, and the honorary mayor as chairman.

=== Mayor ===
Schnorbach's mayor is Bernd Kunz.

=== Coat of arms ===
The municipality's arms might be described thus: Per fess, in chief per pale argent a cross gules and gules three arrows, two in saltire and the other in pale surmounting them, all with heads to chief of the first, and in base argent a fess embattled-counterembattled sable, below which a fess wavy azure.

== Culture and sightseeing ==
=== Buildings ===
The following are listed buildings or sites in Rhineland-Palatinate’s Directory of Cultural Monuments:

- Saint Sebastian’s Catholic Parish Church (Pfarrkirche St. Sebastian), Hauptstraße 2 – long-naved aisleless church, 1709, expansion about 1800; Ferres tomb, pinnacle with “milkwort” finial, about 1884
- Hauptstraße 3 – former rectory; timber-frame building, partly solid or slated, marked 1751; before the house, Gothic Revival warriors’ memorial 1870/1871

=== Clubs ===
The municipality's cultural life is characterized by the sport club Germania Schnorbach with offerings in leisure sports (gymnastics, dancing, hiking) and the women's club. On the village's outskirts is a sporting ground. For the events that the municipality stages and for family celebrations, the municipal centre is available. The municipality's youth have set up a youth centre there, too.

== Economy and infrastructure ==
The number of agricultural operations has shrunk from 26 to 10 part-time operations. Nonetheless, the village has kept its rural character.

Jobs in Schnorbach are to be had at a floor-building business and a plastering shop, although nobody from Schnorbach actually works in these places. All workers living in the municipality commute to and from work.

Beginning in the early 1990s, a new building zone was opened up in stages with 25 plots, of which more than 80% have been sold; most now have buildings on them.

=== Transport ===
Transport links are quite favourable. Bundesstraße 50 is 2 km (1 mi) away. The Autobahn A 61 (Rheinböllen interchange) is 6 km (4 mi) away. Frankfurt-Hahn Airport lies roughly 25 km (16 mi) away. The upper centres of Mainz and Koblenz can each be reached over the A 61 in about 35 minutes.

=== Education ===
Children attend kindergarten and primary school in Argenthal. The Hauptschule and centres of higher learning are right nearby in Rheinböllen and Simmern.
