= Mutterschied =

- Municipality
- Coat of arms

- Location of Mutterschied within Rhein-Hunsrück-Kreis district
- Interactive map of Mutterschied
- Location within Germany Location within Rhineland-Palatinate
- Coordinates: 49°59′0″N 7°34′9″E
- Country: Germany
- State: Rhineland-Palatinate
- District: Rhein-Hunsrück-Kreis
- Municipal assoc.: Simmern-Rheinböllen

Government
  - Mayor (2019–24): Hendrik Sand

Area
  - Total: 3.07 km^{2} (1.19 sq mi)
- Elevation: 410 m (1,350 ft)

Population (2025-12-31)
  - Total: 469
  - Density: 153/km^{2} (396/sq mi)
- Time zone: UTC+01:00 (CET)
  - Summer (DST): UTC+02:00 (CEST)
- Postal codes: 55469
- Dialling codes: 06761
- Vehicle registration: SIM
- Website: www.mutterschied-online.de

Mutterschied is an Ortsgemeinde – a municipality belonging to a Verbandsgemeinde, a kind of collective municipality – in the Rhein-Hunsrück-Kreis (district) in Rhineland-Palatinate, Germany. It belongs to the Verbandsgemeinde Simmern-Rheinböllen, whose seat is in Simmern.

== Geography ==
=== Location ===
The municipality lies in the central Hunsrück between Argenthal and Simmern on the edge of the Simmerner Mulde (hollow). Mutterschied, with its share of the once royally owned Soonwald, a heavily wooded section of the west-central Hunsrück, held since 1311 at the latest, has been one of the northern Soonwald villages since at least that time. The wooded portion, which is an outlying piece of the municipal area, not contiguous with the main portion, lies near the Simmerkopf, the district's highest peak.

== History ==
=== Antiquity ===
The local area was originally settled by Celts. In Roman times, the settlement lay at the corner of two Roman roads; to the southwest ran the main road between Trier and Bingen, while to the north ran another road between Simmern and Bacharach. Finds in the cadastral area known as Herzefeld have yielded remnants of a Roman way station and also coins from the Emperor Hadrian’s time (117-138). There was once a Roman villa rustica 700 m south of the spot where the church now stands. There have also been scattered finds of Roman potsherds, and two finds, one 700 m west of the village and the other 500 m east, have involved fragments of basalt quernstones.

After a drop in population on the Hunsrück in the Migration Period (370-500), a new wave of settlement began towards the end of the 9th century. Mudinscheid, as it was once known according to the oldest written reference to the village, arose along with many other places in these Carolingian times (village names ending in —roth, —scheid or —schied are a reference to land clearing at that time). The names Mudin and Madin are also recorded for the village, and all three stem from the Frankish national patron, Saint Martin. To this day, Mutterschied is known in the local speech as Maddin. The placename ending —scheid, or later —schied means “delimited wooded area”. The Waldgraves (the Emichones, or Emicho's descendants) had the right of “best head” in 950 over a share of the population (this was an early death duty in which the lord received a peasant's best head of livestock upon the peasant's death).

=== Middle Ages ===
In 1074, it is certain that Mudinscheid belonged to the territory of the Provostry of Ravengiersburg, as it was also subject to the blood court at the Nunkirch. About 1275, Mudinscheid belonged to the Wittelsbach Counts Palatine of the Rhine, later passing to the Dukes of Palatinate-Simmern. Later the village became a Palatine Inngericht (court district). In 1311, 45 Märker (members of a communal management body, in this case for a forest) were put to work, each of them receiving a yearly “fathom” of wood (that is, a stack of logs measuring one fathom by one fathom at one end) from the symerer waldt (Simmern Forest). In 1346, the village had to pay tithes to Bishop of Trier Baldwin of Luxembourg. In 1368 the Mudinscheid Chapel was incorporated into Saint Giles's Foundation in Neustadt. The self-administering Inngericht of Mutterschied formed a Schultheißerei with the municipalities of Mörschbach, Schnorbach and Wahlbach.

=== Renaissance ===
In 1536, Duke Johann II united the benefices of Muderscheidt (as it was then spelt) and Riesweiler and transferred them to a priest who was then meant to move house to Muderscheidt. In 1557, the Reformation was introduced and the village became at first Lutheran and then later Reformed. In 1599, there were 23 hearths (for which, read “households”) in Muderscheidt. By 1608, the spelling had become Muderschitt, and the village had become a branch of the parish of Schnorbach. In the Thirty Years' War (1618–1648), the legendary Oberhausen near Moederscheit (another new spelling) was destroyed. In 1656, there were ten families, one widow and two guardians. In 1686, after the Dukes of Palatinate-Simmern had died out and the village had returned to the Electorate of the Palatinate, the Catholic faith was no longer forbidden and the Catholic congregation belonged to Saint Joseph's parish in Simmern, which from 1683 to 1803 was led by the Carmelites from Boppard). In 1688, war once again beset the Hunsrück, bringing about widespread destruction. This time it was the Nine Years' War (known in Germany as the Pfälzischer Erbfolgekrieg, or War of the Palatine Succession), and once again, the legendary Oberhausen was destroyed. In 1698, the heraldically important Moderschit (as it had come to be spelt) court seal came into being, bearing an image of Saint Dorothea as the main charge. In 1712, the oldest datable house in Moderschit was built, Rheingans-Renzler. In 1745, the Wald-Henrich-John house was built. In 1751, the Catholic community began planning for a new church. Seventeen men took on this task, and their names are recorded (Johann Becker, Johann Nikolaus Becker, Matthias Diehl, Christoph Diel, Paul Diel, Hartmann, Nikolaus Karl, Tobias Karl, Jakob Kist, Johann Krämer, Adam Nau, Jakob Rödel, Peter Rödel, Peter Rötsch, Christoph Sachsemeier, Matthias Staudt, Peter Vogt). Building work began in 1753. In 1757, the chapel that still stands now was finished and was given its benefice by the Simmern Carmelite prior Otto. It is consecrated to the Fourteen Holy Helpers: Agathius, Barbara, Blaise, Catherine of Alexandria, Christopher, Cyriacus, Denis, Erasmus, Eustace, George, Giles, Margaret of Antioch, Pantaleon and Vitus; it is further consecrated to the “Penitent”, Mary Magdalene. In 1758, there were 108 Catholics in Mutterschied. Reformed parishioners objected to the building of the church. On 28 July 1766, Christoph Saxemeyer became the first person from Mutterschied to emigrate to Hungary's Banat region. It was, however, another 21 years before the others followed, on 27 October 1787.

=== Napoleonic times ===
Beginning in 1794, the Hunsrück lay under French rule, and the patchwork of various states in the region was swept away. Mutterschied was plundered by French Revolutionary troops, and the court books were burnt. Mutterschied belonged to the Mairie (“Mayoralty”) of Simmern. In 1796, there was rinderpest in Mutterschied; it all but wiped the village's livestock out. At this time, Mutterschied had 197 inhabitants in 38 houses with 28 barns. In 1805, Nicolas Littger from Mutterschied became the Adjunkt (mayor's representative) of Simmern. Between 1805 and 1807, the forest hitherto communally held was split up and shared out to various municipalities. Mutterschied got 102 ha. In 1806 and 1807, hundreds of fruit trees were planted within the municipality's limits. In 1809, Mutterschied had 261 inhabitants. In 1813, a new graveyard was laid out on the road to Argenthal, up from the village. In 1814, French rule came to an end and the Hunsrück was occupied by the Bavarians until the end of the Congress of Vienna in 1816.

=== Prussian times ===
In 1816, the whole Hunsrück became Prussian, but for the Birkenfelder Land (Principality of Birkenfeld), which went to the Duchy (later Grand Duchy) of Oldenburg. It was in this time that the Regierungsbezirk of Koblenz and the district (Landkreis) of Simmern came into being. Mutterschied itself, meanwhile, remained in its Mairie of Simmern, although this was now Germanized to the Bürgermeisterei of Simmern (meaning the same); from this time forth and long afterwards, the mayor was Peter-Josef Rottmann.

In 1820, the following people were earning a living at various trades: Christoph Sehn (wine steward), Adam Martin (linen weaver), Friedrich Öhl (linen weaver), Peter Martin (linen weaver), Peter Zillig (linen weaver), Peter Marbach (shoemaker), Andreas Diel (carpenter), Valentin Martin (tailor), Christoph Beil (tailor), Christoph Reuther (blacksmith), Jacob Baumgarten (porcelain dealer), Christoph Baumgarten (gardener), Adam Vogt (linen weaver). In 1824, Mutterschied citizen Nicolas Schneider junior (Schneirer-Nicels) began a “housebook” into which until 1870 he entered things of importance, such as the growing of Krundbirnen in 1829. This was a local variation of Grundbirnen, literally “ground pears”, that is to say, potatoes.

In 1830, there was a great fire in Mutterschied, and three farms had to be built all over again. The Ludwig, Kunz and Jost properties arose once again by 1833 with a typical Franconian farm layout. In the mid-1830s, there was some unusual weather. Nicolas Schneider reported on 25 March 1834: “It is to be noted, and this is a benchmark for posterity, that in this year, even in the month of January, one could gather green fodder in the fields every day and there were flowers in the gardens and thus far, almost no snow has been seen.”

In 1838, a school building was built to serve as an Evangelical and Catholic elementary school. In 1840, Mutterschied had 474 inhabitants. In the years 1843 to 1854, there was widespread hunger. The famine became so bad that a considerable portion of the population emigrated to Brazil. A particularly great wave of emigration came in 1845 when 49 people went to Brazil.

The year 1848 brought revolution. Mutterschied produced two men who took part in the lawmaking bodies that came out of the revolution: Jacob Prinz served in the Prussian National Assembly and Peter Wald I in the Frankfurt Parliament. The municipality helped the poorest with all their strength, for example by selling valuable oak. In 1864, Mutterschied had 480 inhabitants, 308 ha of land and 8 ha of municipal woodland within its limits. In 1868, Mutterschied's first fire brigade list was drawn up.

Even into the 19th century, there was a Yeniche ironworking community between Mutterschied and Altweidelbach whose graveyard can still be discerned.

=== Imperial times ===
The Empire brought along with it greater autonomy for municipalities; Mutterschied had its own mayor, bearing the title Vorsteher (“forestander”) rather than Bürgermeister. In 1876, 48 Mutterschied men were listed as firefighters. On 12 and 13 June 1904, the Mutterschied veterans’ club held its anniversary festival. On 12 July that same year, 28 men founded a gymnastic club, TuS 04 Mutterschied. In 1905, Mutterschied had 367 inhabitants. In the First World War, 19 men from Mutterschied fell, and one went missing.

=== Weimar times ===
In the time between the world wars, the Rhineland was occupied by the French. In 1923, the French occupational forces deported railway families from the Hunsrück after the great railway strike. Among these was Mutterschied's Peter Metzger along with his wife and five children. Only after a year were they allowed to come back. In 1925, Mutterschied had 392 inhabitants. In 1932, another new graveyard was laid out.

=== The Third Reich ===
The Nazis forced the introduction of interdenominational schooling for Evangelical and Catholic schoolchildren. Some people from Mutterschied became victims of state arbitrariness. In 1939, Mutterschied had 364 inhabitants. In late April 1942, the churchbell was taken away for war requirements. In the Second World War, 19 men from Mutterschied fell, and three went missing. In 1944 and 1945, there were prisoners of war in Mutterschied, about 6 Ukrainians and Poles. They were repatriated in 1945, although one Pole, Alex B., chose to stay. On 16 March 1945, the village was occupied by the Americans; members of a German military support unit who were in the village were captured and imprisoned.

=== West Germany ===
Since 1946, Mutterschied has been part of the then newly founded state of Rhineland-Palatinate.

In 1949, the church got a new bell frame, and the new bell was dedicated by Dean Hardt. In 1957, Mutterschied had 308 inhabitants. Flurbereinigung was undertaken in 1958, and in the time that followed, outlying farms (Aussiedlerhöfe) were built on the Rheinbach. In 1963, Mutterschied had 327 inhabitants. In 1964, a fire in Mutterschied burnt two homesteads down. In 1965, a new building area arose on the cadastral area known as the “Hundsacker” (“Dog’s Field”). In 1966, Mutterschied had 383 inhabitants. In 1968, the school in Mutterschied was closed. About 1970, a number of new farms were established. Beginning in 1970, Mutterschied's demographics changed with the arrival of the first Turkish nationals. In 1980, the municipal coat of arms was approved. In 1984, the church's exterior and the churchyard were renovated. In 1985, Mutterschied had 434 inhabitants. In 1986, the old school was rededicated as the new community centre.

=== Since Reunification ===
On 23 June 1991, a new altar was consecrated in Mutterschied by Vicar General Gerhard Jakob (d. 1999), who later became Auxiliary Bishop of Trier. In 2000, the Rheinbach farms passed to Simmern, and Mutterschied also bought more land. In 2001, another new building area was laid out up from the Murschbach. The village was expanded into this area. In 2004, the gymnastic club marked its centenary. In 2008, the Chapel of the Fourteen Holy Helpers and Mary Magdalene marked its 250th anniversary of consecration

== Politics ==
=== Municipal council ===
The council is made up of 8 council members, who were elected by majority vote at the municipal election held on 7 June 2009, and the honorary mayor as chairman.

=== Mayor ===
Mutterschied's mayor is Hendrik Sand.

=== Coat of arms ===
The municipality's arms might be described thus: A pale paly bendy argent and azure between gules a palm leaf palewise Or and sable a lion rampant of the fourth armed and langued of the third.

== Culture and sightseeing ==
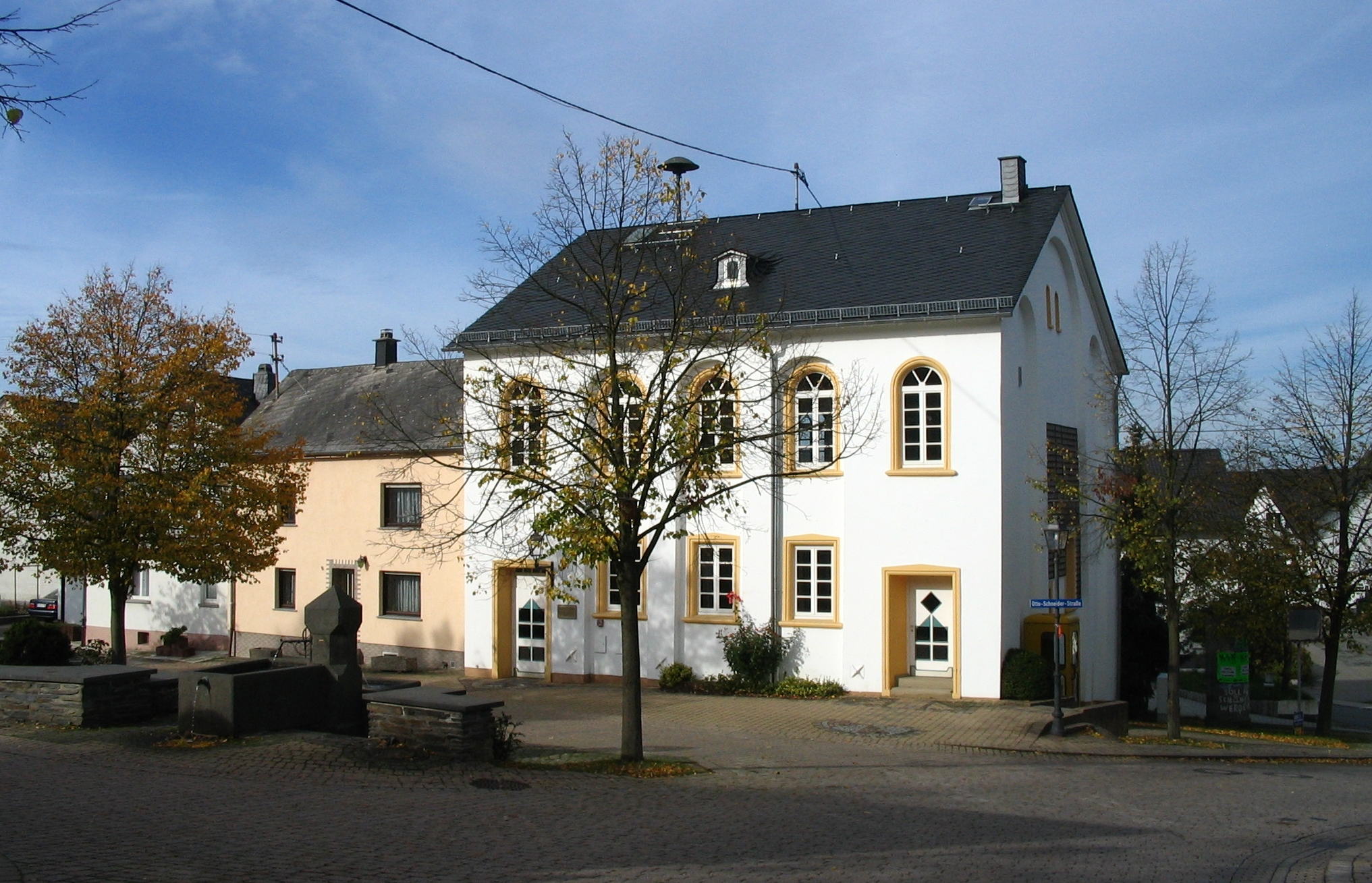
Otto-Schneider-Straße: former school

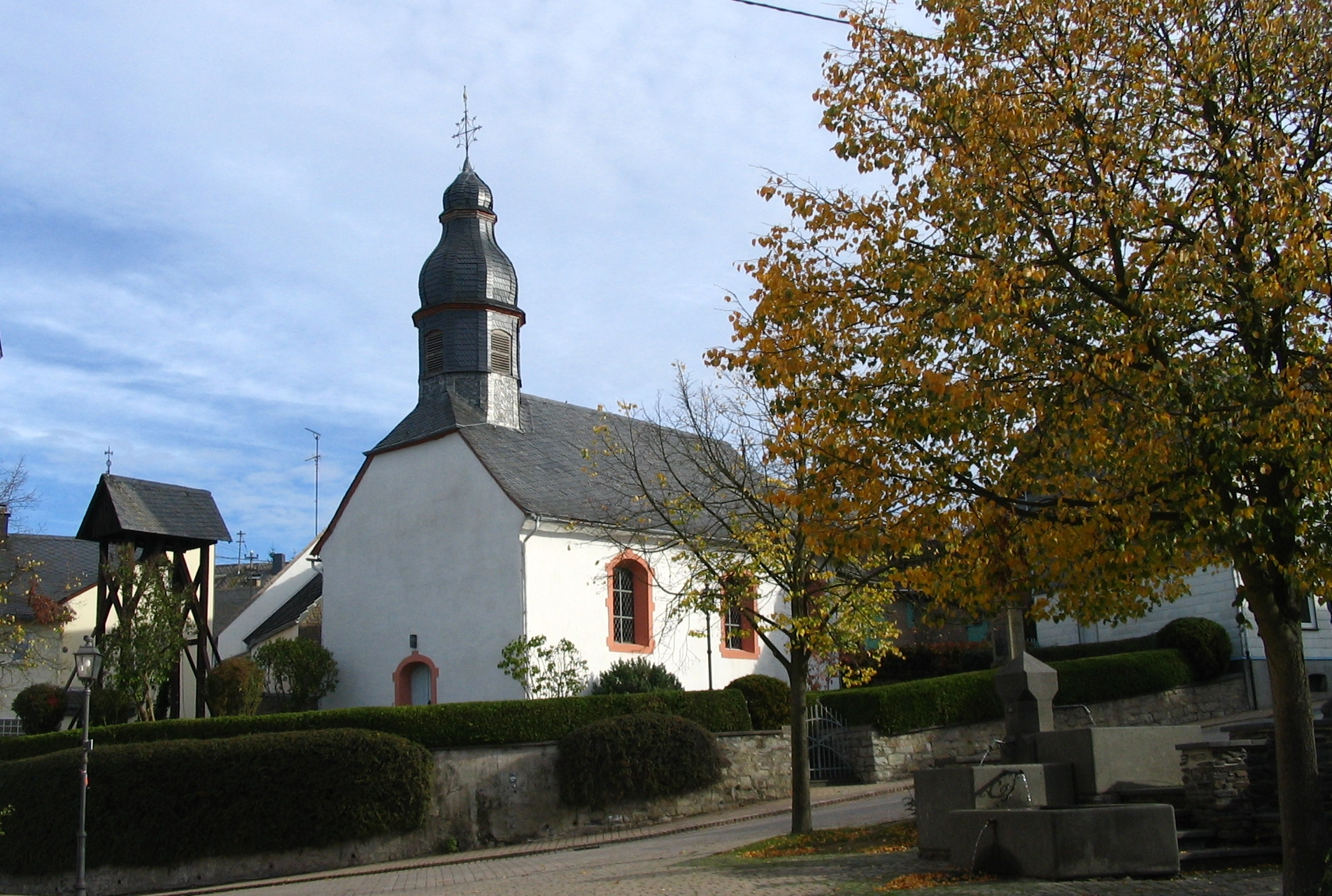
Simmerner Straße 4: Fourteen Holy Helpers' Catholic Church

=== Buildings ===
The following are listed buildings or sites in Rhineland-Palatinate’s Directory of Cultural Monuments:

- The Fourteen Holy Helpers’ Catholic Church (branch church; Filialkirche 14 Nothelfer), Simmerner Straße 4 – aisleless church, 1751–1754
- Otto-Schneider-Straße 2 – former school; Late Classicist plastered building, 1838
- Riesweiler Weg 4 – timber-frame Quereinhaus (a combination residential and commercial house divided for these two purposes down the middle, perpendicularly to the street), sided, half-hipped roof, early 19th century
