= Altweidelbach =

- Municipality
- Coat of arms

- Location of Altweidelbach within Rhein-Hunsrück-Kreis district
- Interactive map of Altweidelbach
- Location within Germany Location within Rhineland-Palatinate
- Coordinates: 49°59′42.68″N 7°33′58.95″E
- Country: Germany
- State: Rhineland-Palatinate
- District: Rhein-Hunsrück-Kreis
- Municipal assoc.: Simmern-Rheinböllen

Government
  - Mayor (2019–24): Volker Berg

Area
  - Total: 4.1 km^{2} (1.6 sq mi)
- Elevation: 412 m (1,352 ft)

Population (2025-12-31)
  - Total: 291
  - Density: 71/km^{2} (180/sq mi)
- Time zone: UTC+01:00 (CET)
  - Summer (DST): UTC+02:00 (CEST)
- Postal codes: 55469
- Dialling codes: 06761
- Vehicle registration: SIM

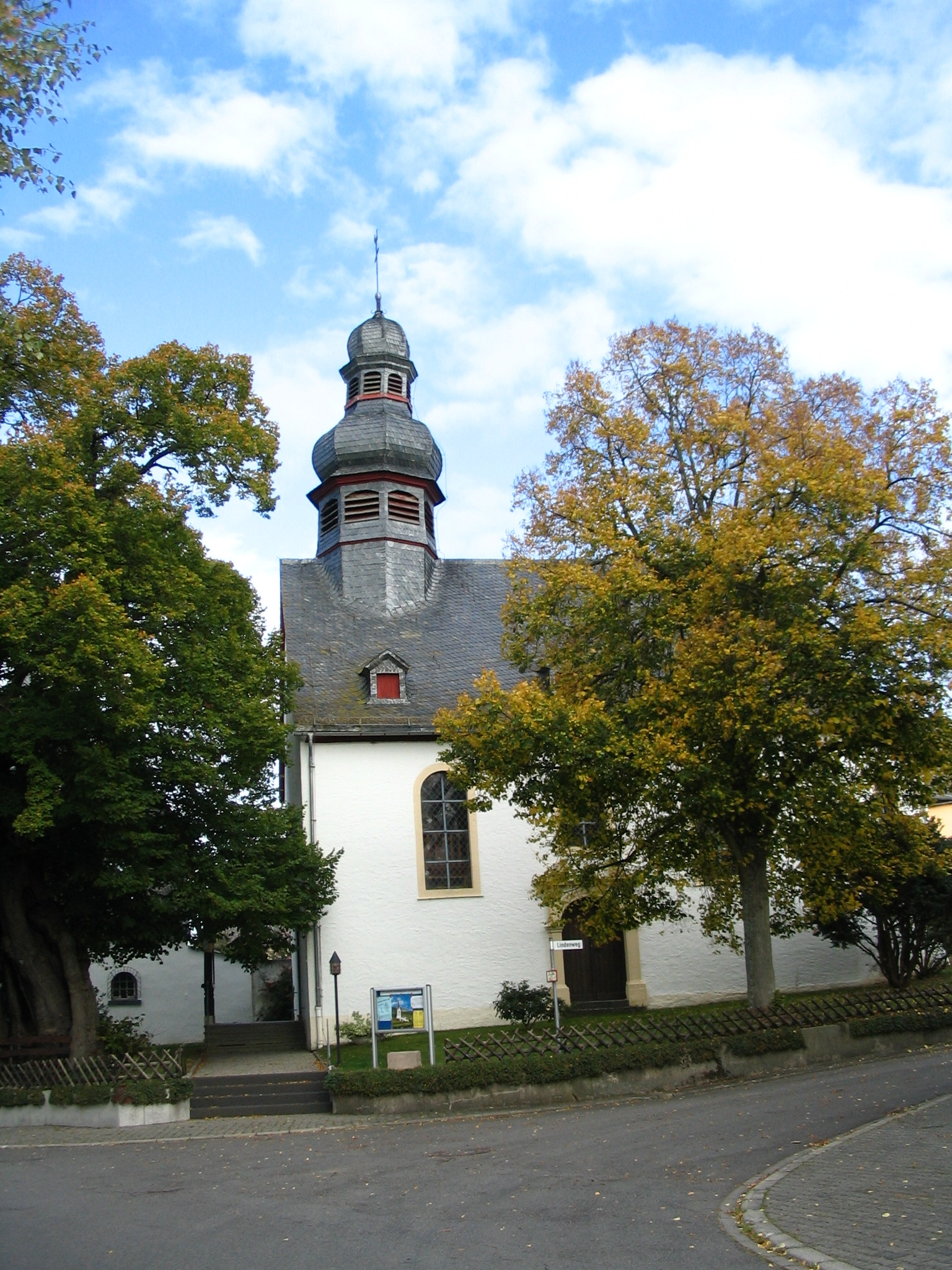
Altweidelbach Church

Altweidelbach is an Ortsgemeinde – a municipality belonging to a Verbandsgemeinde, a kind of collective municipality – in the Rhein-Hunsrück-Kreis (district) in Rhineland-Palatinate, Germany. It belongs to the Verbandsgemeinde Simmern-Rheinböllen, whose seat is in Simmern.

== Geography ==
=== Location ===
The municipality lies in a hollow north of the Soonwald, a heavily wooded section of the west-central Hunsrück, and north of Bundesstraße 50, roughly 3 km east of the district seat of Simmern. Its elevation is 430 m above sea level.

== History ==
Archaeological finds make it clear that the municipal area was already settled in Roman times. South of the heights, north of Mutterschied, the site of a Roman country estate was ascertained. Furthermore, Altweidelbach's municipal area was crossed by one of the linking roads built by the Romans, the so-called Steinstraße (“Stone Road”). Also, a Roman urn was unearthed in the “Hammesheck” cadastral area about 1860.

The village's actual founding, though, only came about after Roman rule and even the Migration Period (Völkerwanderung) ended. In the second phase of their settling activities in the 8th century, the Franks founded many places with names ending in —hausen and —bach. It is likely that Altweidelbach was founded in this time, too.

In 1006, Altweidelbach had its first documentary mention in a document with which Archbishop Williges from Mainz consecrated the newly built church at Mörschbach and confirmed its status as a parish. The spelling Widimbach used in this document, out of which first Widelbach and then Weidelbach developed, yields a clue as to the name's origin. Linguists believe that it derives from the Old High German word wida (“willow tree”; Weide in Modern High German), and explain the name's meaning as “Brook With Willow Trees”. Only since the 16th century has the municipality used the prefix Alt— (“Old”) to distinguish itself from another, nearby place called Weidelbach, itself now called Kleinweidelbach (an outlying centre of Rheinböllen).

In 1006, the village was under the lordship of the founder of the Mörschbach church, Thidrich von Mörschbach, who also held the office of Vogt. Later in the 11th century, the village passed to the Bertholde regional comital family (Gaugrafen), and in 1074 it was annexed to the Ravengiersburg Monastery, which had been raised to a canonical foundation, although for the time being, it kept its own court of Schöffen (roughly “lay jurists”) with its own judicial district. High jurisdiction, owing to the more serious crimes being subject to bodily punishment, was wielded by the Ravengiersburg Vogtei court at the High Court Square (Hochgerichtsplatz) at the Nunkirche (church). Whenever assizes took place, the villagers of Altweidelbach were obliged to furnish the crossbeam for the gallows, as well as a ladder. The village court, on the other hand, on whose bench sat three or four Schöffen, was held twice a year, in May and again on Saint Martin's Day (11 November), under the village limetree, chaired by the monastery director or the Schultheiß.

Between 1410 and 1598 and again between 1610 and 1673, Altweidelbach belonged to the autonomous Palatine Duchy of Simmern, and between 1598 and 1610, as well as after 1673 until the French occupation that began in 1794, it belonged along with the rest of the Simmern territory to Electoral Palatinate. To tighten the administration, each village was made into its own Schultheißerei. In the 17th century, Altweidelbach was united with Mörschbach, Schnorbach and Wahlbach into a single Schultheißerei. The court under this arrangement was made up of, besides the Schultheiß and the court clerk, nine Schöffen, of whom three were drawn from Mörschbach, along with two from each of the other centres.

In the time of the French occupation in 1794, Altweidelbach was thoroughly plundered. Altweidelbach lay under French rule until 1815, when it was assigned to the Kingdom of Prussia at the Congress of Vienna. Great fires struck the village in 1866, 1897 and 1975, when three barns and one house burnt down.

In the First World War, ten men from Altweidelbach fell and two were listed as missing. Following the war, the French were stationed in the village until 1919. The first car was seen in Altweidelbach in 1937. Shortly thereafter came the Second World War, in which four men from Altweidelbach fell and three were listed as missing. In March 1945, the Americans occupied the village. They were relieved by the French in August as the Allies agreed on zones of occupation. In 1946, Altweidelbach became part of the then newly founded state of Rhineland-Palatinate. In 1963, Flurbereinigung was completed. It was as late as 1978 before the village's streets had names. In 2000 and 2001, the Altweidelbach Wind Farm was built, with seven wind turbines. In 2006, the municipality of Altweidelbach marked its one-thousand-year jubilee.

=== Population development ===
There are currently roughly 250 inhabitants in Altweidelbach, but in bygone centuries, the population was quite a bit smaller, and fluctuated considerably. In 1498, 67 adults lived in Altweidelbach, suggesting a total population of roughly 100. The 14 families who lived here in 1599 would have amounted to a similar figure, but in the 17th century, the population dropped sharply with the double blow of the Thirty Years' War and the Plague to only 7 families. In 1672, the count was back up to 48 inhabitants in 12 families. In 1698, there were 58 inhabitants.

== Politics ==
=== Municipal council ===
The council is made up of 6 council members, who were elected at the municipal election held on 7 June 2009, and the honorary mayor as chairman.

=== Mayor ===
Altweidelbach's mayor is Volker Berg.

=== Coat of arms ===
The municipality's arms might be described thus: Per bend Or a church with ridge turret to dexter above a bend sinister wavy azure and sable a lion rampant of the first armed and langued gules.

== Culture and sightseeing ==
=== Buildings ===
The following are listed buildings or sites in Rhineland-Palatinate’s Directory of Cultural Monuments:

- Evangelical church, Hauptstraße/corner of Lindenweg – Baroque aisleless church, marked 1761
- Hauptstraße 1 – building with half-hipped roof, partly slated timber framing, about 1800
- Hauptstraße/corner of Heider Weg – cast-iron fountain basin, Stromberger Hütte (foundry), marked 1885
- On Kreisstraße (District Road) 53, southeast of the village – water cistern; round building with cupola roof, marked 1913
- North of the village – Hammesmühle (or Eselsmühle – a mill); timber-frame house, half-hipped roof, marked 1824, timber-frame barn; whole complex of buildings
- West of the village – Weirichsmühle (or Katzenlochermühle – another mill); two plastered timber-frame houses, one a building with half-hipped roof, early 19th century, barn; whole complex of buildings
