= Wahlbach, Rhineland-Palatinate =

- Municipality
- Coat of arms

- Location of Wahlbach, Rhineland-Palatinate within Rhein-Hunsrück-Kreis district
- Interactive map of Wahlbach, Rhineland-Palatinate
- Location within Germany Location within Rhineland-Palatinate
- Coordinates: 50°0′02″N 7°35′48″E
- Country: Germany
- State: Rhineland-Palatinate
- District: Rhein-Hunsrück-Kreis
- Municipal assoc.: Simmern-Rheinböllen

Government
  - Mayor (2019–24): Volker Mayer

Area
  - Total: 4.34 km^{2} (1.68 sq mi)
- Elevation: 440 m (1,440 ft)

Population (2025-12-31)
  - Total: 188
  - Density: 43.3/km^{2} (112/sq mi)
- Time zone: UTC+01:00 (CET)
  - Summer (DST): UTC+02:00 (CEST)
- Postal codes: 55494
- Dialling codes: 06761
- Vehicle registration: SIM
- Website: www.wahlbach-hunsrueck.de

Wahlbach is an Ortsgemeinde – a municipality belonging to a Verbandsgemeinde, a kind of collective municipality – in the Rhein-Hunsrück-Kreis (district) in Rhineland-Palatinate, Germany. It belongs to the Verbandsgemeinde Simmern-Rheinböllen, whose seat is in Simmern. Wahlbach has some 175 inhabitants.

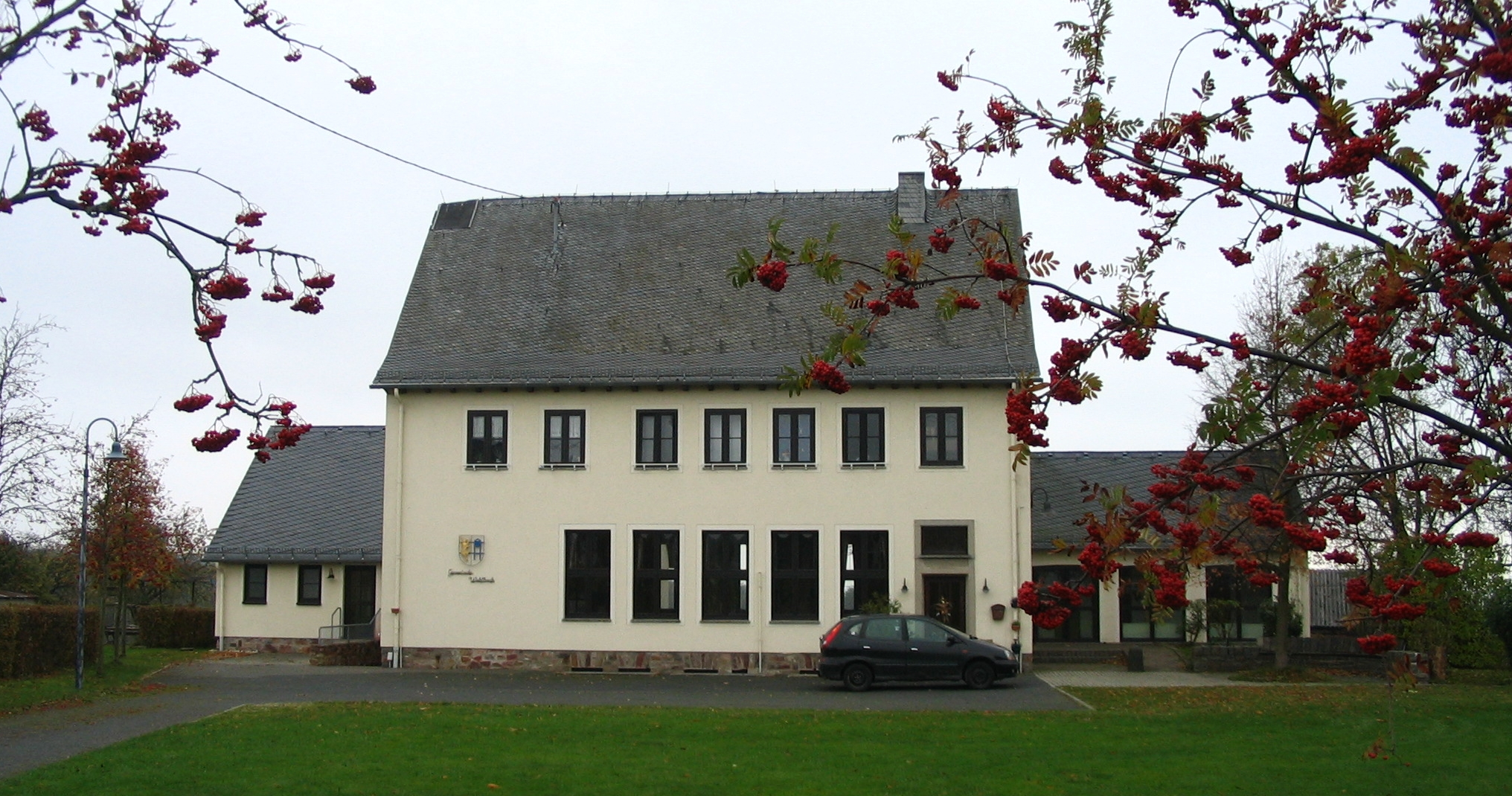
Municipal centre on the village’s outskirts

== Geography ==
=== Location ===
The municipality lies in the Hunsrück, with the municipal area spread out over several hills, giving it an average elevation of 433 m above sea level. Wahlbach lies some 4 km west of Rheinböllen and the Autobahn A 61. To the south, it is roughly 2 km to Argenthal and to the west a good 4 km to Simmern. North of Wahlbach lie the municipalities of Benzweiler, Rayerschied and Pleizenhausen. Wahlbach’s municipal area measures 434 ha, of which 172 ha is wooded.

== History ==
Archaeological finds from barrows bear witness to early habitation. In 1158, Wahlbach had its first documentary mention. The village was a noble family’s namesake, although it died out soon after 1258. Later, the village belonged to Electoral Palatinate “New Court” (neues Gericht), which in 1410 was grouped into the new Duchy of Palatinate-Simmern. In 1556, the duchy introduced the Reformation. In 1673, Wahlbach passed back to Electoral Palatinate and with the occupation of the Rhine’s left bank by French Revolutionary troops in 1794, it became part of France. In 1814 it was assigned to the Kingdom of Prussia at the Congress of Vienna. Since 1946, it has been part of the then newly founded state of Rhineland-Palatinate. In 1961, the Evangelical church was built.

== Politics ==
=== Municipal council ===
The council is made up of 6 council members, who were elected by majority vote, and the honorary mayor as chairman.

=== Mayor ===
Wahlbach’s mayor is Volker Mayer.

== Culture and sightseeing ==
=== Buildings ===
The following are listed buildings or sites in Rhineland-Palatinate’s Directory of Cultural Monuments:

- Dorfstraße – fountain; cast-iron hand pump and basin, Rheinböllen Ironworks, latter half of the 19th century
- Fuchsenmühle, west of Wahlbach – timber-frame house, half-hipped roof, possibly from the 18th century

== Economy and infrastructure ==
The municipal centre at the former school stands on the village’s outskirts. In the village centre is the old fountain, while the belltower stands in the upper village. There, the two Kreisstraßen (District Roads) 50 and 52 cross each other.
