= Pleizenhausen =

- Municipality
- Coat of arms

- Location of Pleizenhausen within Rhein-Hunsrück-Kreis district
- Interactive map of Pleizenhausen
- Location within Germany Location within Rhineland-Palatinate
- Coordinates: 50°0′56″N 7°34′11″E
- Country: Germany
- State: Rhineland-Palatinate
- District: Rhein-Hunsrück-Kreis
- Municipal assoc.: Simmern-Rheinböllen

Government
  - Mayor (2019–24): Thomas Keller

Area
  - Total: 4.04 km^{2} (1.56 sq mi)
- Elevation: 365 m (1,198 ft)

Population (2025-12-31)
  - Total: 322
  - Density: 79.7/km^{2} (206/sq mi)
- Time zone: UTC+01:00 (CET)
  - Summer (DST): UTC+02:00 (CEST)
- Postal codes: 55469
- Dialling codes: 06761
- Vehicle registration: SIM
- Website: www.pleizenhausen.de

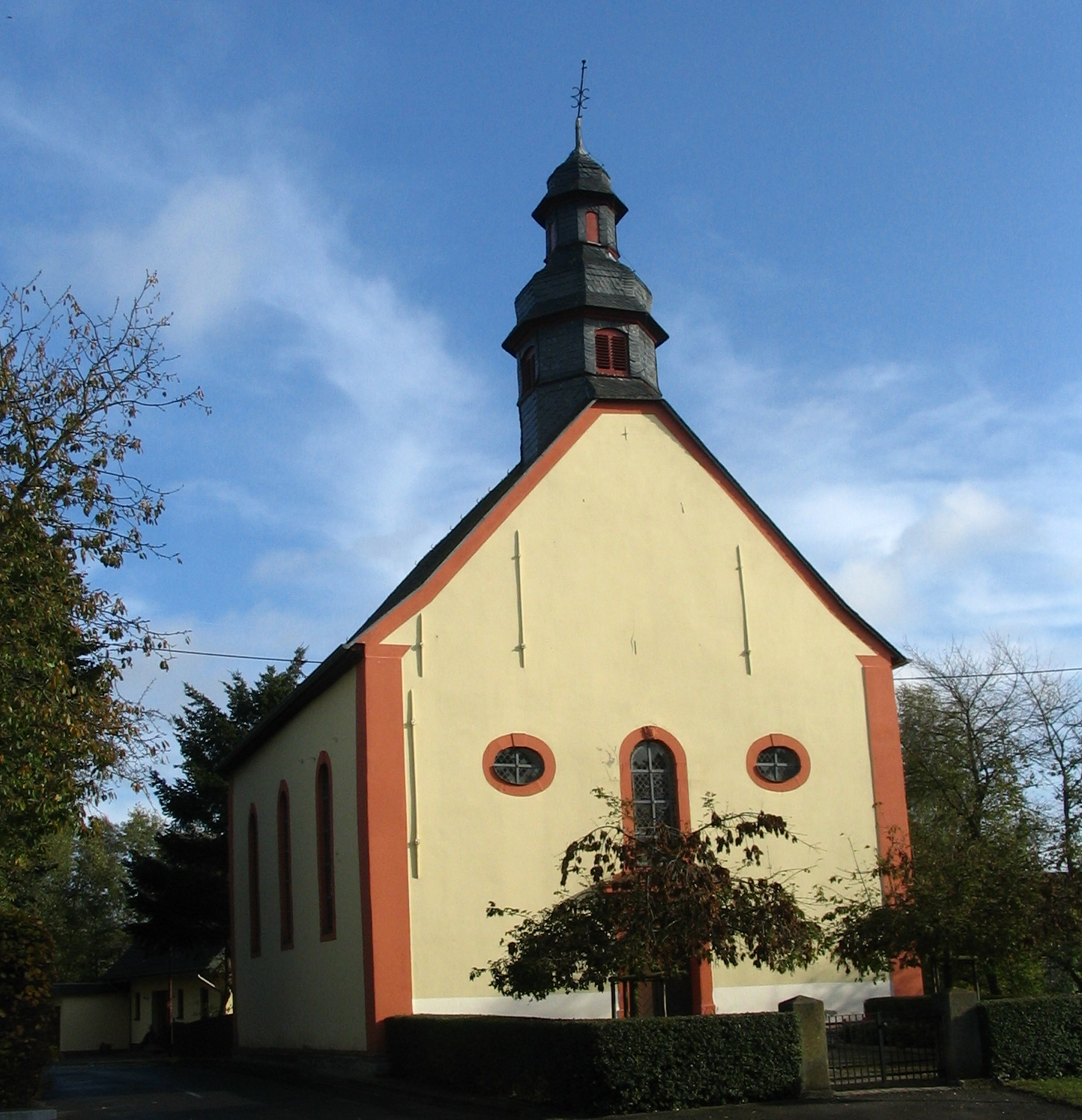
Evangelical church

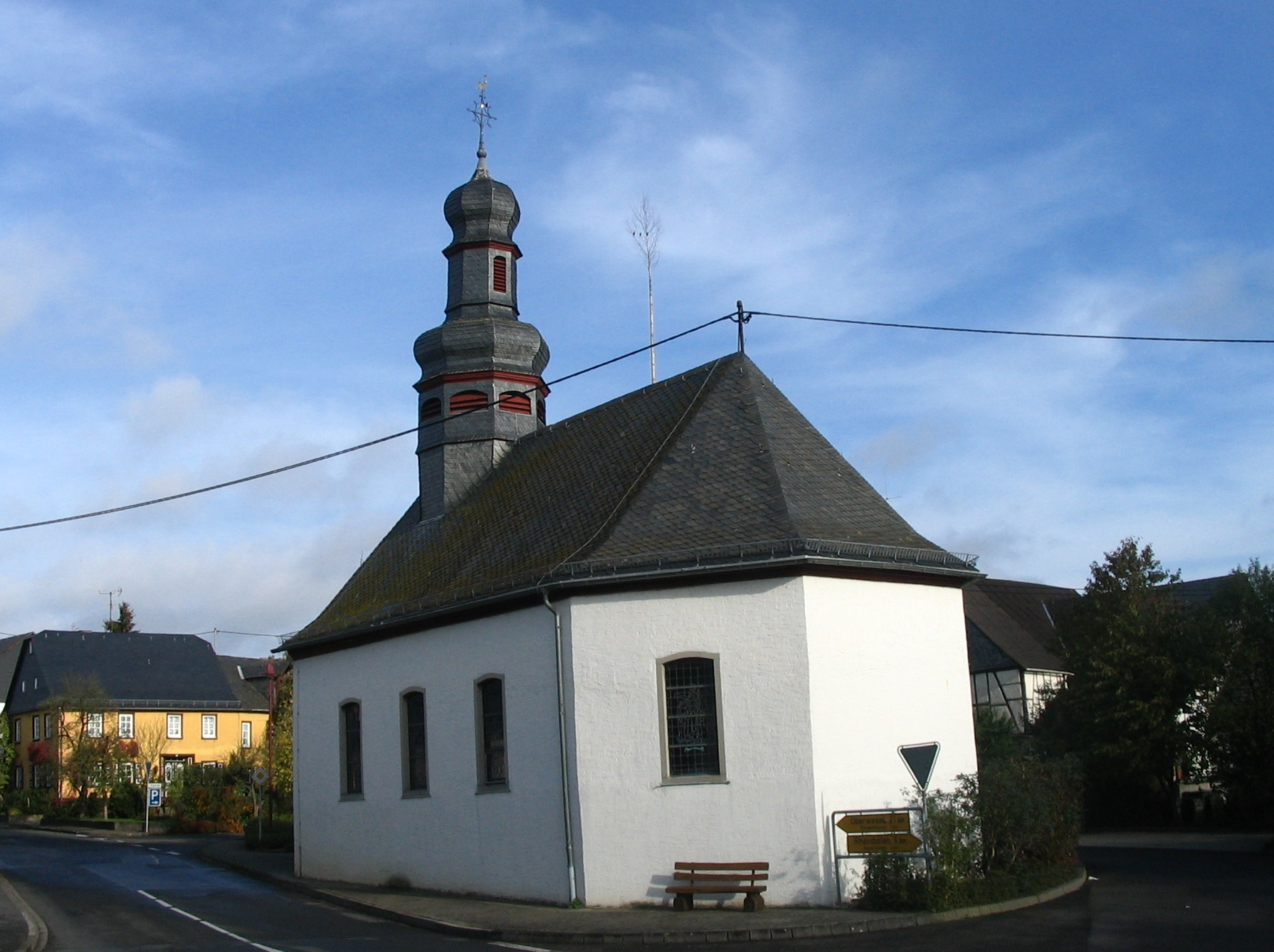
Saint Wendelin’s Catholic Chapel

Pleizenhausen is an Ortsgemeinde – a municipality belonging to a Verbandsgemeinde, a kind of collective municipality – in the Rhein-Hunsrück-Kreis (district) in Rhineland-Palatinate, Germany. It belongs to the Verbandsgemeinde Simmern-Rheinböllen, whose seat is in Simmern.

== Geography ==
=== Location ===
The municipality lies in the Hunsrück, roughly 5 km northeast of Simmern. The residential village also lies just west of the junction of two valleys, the Simmerbachtal and the Wahlbachtal, and about a kilometre east of the Simmern-Koblenz road. At the nearby Weißmühle (“White Mill”), three brooks, the Simmerbach, Benzweilerbach and Wahlbach, all meet and flow together. The Geiersberg to the northeast stands as a prominent peak between the Simmerbach and Benzweilerbach valleys and stands out quite clearly on a relief map.

== History ==
In 1098, Pleizenhausen had its first documentary mention in a directory of holdings kept by Saint Symeon’s Foundation at Trier. It can, however, be assumed that there was settlement within Pleizenhausen’s current limits much earlier, for to the southwest of the village, remnants of an old Roman villa rustica are still being found in the fields even now. Furthermore, roadbuilding work also brought to light stones from the Roman road whose existence had long been supposed. In 1251, King William II of Holland had an army camp at Pleizenhausen, whence he moved on to Boppard. In the time that followed, Pleizenhausen’s rulers changed often. In 1263, the Knights Eberhard of Sütersten sold Pleizenhausen’s wet meadow to the Kumbd Cistercian convent. The Counts of Sponheim shared the 24 fiefs with the Lords of Stein Kallenfels. Each was responsible for half the court cases, forfeits and crimes. In 1400, Count Palatine Rupprecht enfeoffed Dietmar of Reifenberg with the tithes from Pleizenhausen. In 1500, there were 20 farmsteads, and jurisdiction was shared among the Electorate of the Palatinate, Sponheim-Kastellaun, the Lords of Stein Kallenfels and the Schmidtburgs.

From 1673, there was a school in Pleizenhausen serving the villages of Bergenhausen, Pleizenhausen, Rayerschied and Altweidelbach. There were often disagreements between parents, teachers and clerical school inspectors over such things as schooling hours and teachers’ pay. In 1738, the people of Altweidelbach withdrew from the arrangement because of the great distance to the school. Until 1824, the school was housed in the so-called Altes Gebäude (“Old Building”), which stood next to the church. This was a great stable building on whose upper floor the schoolroom was found. Later, across from what was then the rectory, a small school building with a teacher’s dwelling was built. This served until 1911, when a new, and for that time more comfortable, schoolhouse came into service. Classes were last held in this building in 1971.

Beginning in 1794, Pleizenhausen lay under French rule. In 1815 it was assigned to the Kingdom of Prussia at the Congress of Vienna.

Already standing on the spot where now stands the church built in 1793 was, as early as the turn of that century, another church, which was consecrated to Saint Wendelin. In 1706, this church passed into the Reformed Church’s hands. Farther south, the Catholics built their own church in 1772, a chapel that still stands today, also consecrated to Saint Wendelin.

In the Second World War, a 1943 air battle left three farms ablaze from tracer bullets. Between Bergenhausen and Pleizenhausen lay a camp run by the Nazi Reichsarbeitsdienst, which was utterly destroyed by bombing in 1945. Since 1946, Pleizenhausen has been part of the then newly founded state of Rhineland-Palatinate.

In the 1960s and 1970s, the village was stricken remarkably often by catastrophic fires, leading people to muse that the village’s old name Blitzenhusen might have been an old curse that was still affecting Pleizenhausen in the present (Blitz means “lightning” in German). In June 1998, the municipality celebrated its 900-year jubilee with a great festival.

== Politics ==
=== Municipal council ===
The council is made up of 6 council members, who were elected by majority vote at the municipal election held on 7 June 2009, and the honorary mayor as chairman.

=== Mayor ===
Pleizenhausen’s mayor is Thomas Keller.

== Culture and sightseeing ==
=== Buildings ===
The following are listed buildings or sites in Rhineland-Palatinate’s Directory of Cultural Monuments:

- Evangelical parish church, Hauptstraße 4 – aisleless church, marked 1794; standing before it, a cross
- Saint Wendelin’s Catholic Church (Kirche St. Wendelin), Oberweseler Straße 2 – aisleless church, marked 1772; whole complex of buildings with graveyard
- Hauptstraße 7 – L-shaped estate; building with half-hipped roof, timber framing plastered, early 19th century
