= Rayerschied =

- Municipality
- Coat of arms

- Location of Rayerschied within Rhein-Hunsrück-Kreis district
- Interactive map of Rayerschied
- Location within Germany Location within Rhineland-Palatinate
- Coordinates: 50°1′7″N 7°35′11″E
- Country: Germany
- State: Rhineland-Palatinate
- District: Rhein-Hunsrück-Kreis
- Municipal assoc.: Simmern-Rheinböllen

Government
  - Mayor (2019–24): José Miguel Nieves Päschkes

Area
  - Total: 2.51 km^{2} (0.97 sq mi)
- Elevation: 392 m (1,286 ft)

Population (2025-12-31)
  - Total: 113
  - Density: 45.0/km^{2} (117/sq mi)
- Time zone: UTC+01:00 (CET)
  - Summer (DST): UTC+02:00 (CEST)
- Postal codes: 55469
- Dialling codes: 06766
- Vehicle registration: SIM
- Website: www.rayerschied.de

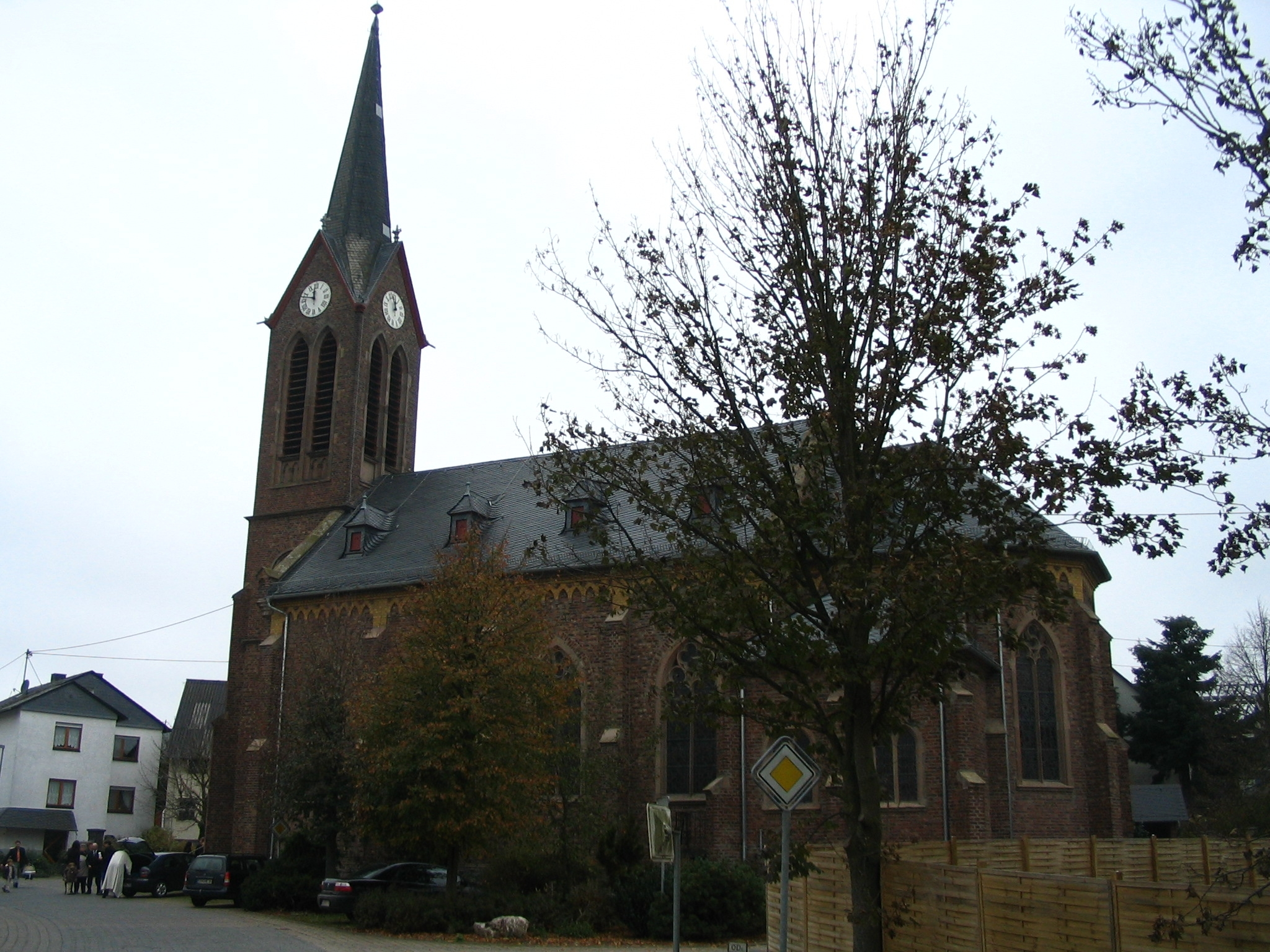
Kirchstraße 2: Saint John of Nepomuk Catholic Church

Rayerschied is an Ortsgemeinde – a municipality belonging to a Verbandsgemeinde, a kind of collective municipality – in the Rhein-Hunsrück-Kreis (district) in Rhineland-Palatinate, Germany. It belongs to the Verbandsgemeinde Simmern-Rheinböllen, whose seat is in Simmern.

== Geography ==
=== Location ===
The residential municipality lies in the Hunsrück between Pleizenhausen and Bergenhausen 7 km from Simmern.

== History ==
In 1204, Rayerschied had its first documentary mention in a donation document from the Kumbd Convent. From 1420, the village belonged to the Amt of Simmern, and later also to Palatinate-Simmern. In 1498, the village was mentioned as Reinßrath. In 1673, Rayerschied passed to Electoral Palatinate. Beginning in 1794, Rayerschied lay under French rule. In 1814 it was assigned to the Kingdom of Prussia at the Congress of Vienna. Since 1946, it has been part of the then newly founded state of Rhineland-Palatinate.

== Politics ==
=== Municipal council ===
The council is made up of 6 council members, who were elected by majority vote at the municipal election held on 7 June 2009, and the honorary mayor as chairman.

=== Mayor ===
Rayerschied's mayor is José Miguel Nieves Päschkes.

=== Coat of arms ===
The municipality's arms might be described thus: Under a chief lozengy argent and azure, per pale gules a stork statant of the first and argent a cross sable.

== Culture and sightseeing ==
=== Buildings ===
The following are listed buildings or sites in Rhineland-Palatinate’s Directory of Cultural Monuments:

- Saint John of Nepomuk Catholic Church (Kirche St. Johannes Nepomuk), Kirchstraße 2 – Gothic Revival brick building, 1896; before the church a sandstone beam cross, early 19th century; in the parish garden a Baroque baptismal font basin holder

=== Ancient sites ===
There are also barrows in Rayerschied.
