= Erbach, Rhineland-Palatinate =

Erbach
- Municipality
- Location of Erbach within Rhein-Hunsrück-Kreis district
- Interactive map of Erbach
- Location within Germany Location within Rhineland-Palatinate
- Coordinates: 50°01′34″N 7°40′54″E
- Country: Germany
- State: Rhineland-Palatinate
- District: Rhein-Hunsrück-Kreis
- Municipal assoc.: Simmern-Rheinböllen

Government
  - Mayor (2019–24): Paul Schirra

Area
  - Total: 1.65 km^{2} (0.64 sq mi)
- Elevation: 410 m (1,350 ft)

Population (2025-12-31)
  - Total: 300
  - Density: 180/km^{2} (470/sq mi)
- Time zone: UTC+01:00 (CET)
  - Summer (DST): UTC+02:00 (CEST)
- Postal codes: 55494
- Dialling codes: 06764
- Vehicle registration: SIM

Erbach (German pronunciation: [ˈɛʁbax]) is an Ortsgemeinde – a municipality belonging to a Verbandsgemeinde, a kind of collective municipality – in the Rhein-Hunsrück-Kreis (district) in Rhineland-Palatinate, Germany. It belongs to the Verbandsgemeinde Simmern-Rheinböllen, whose seat is in Simmern.

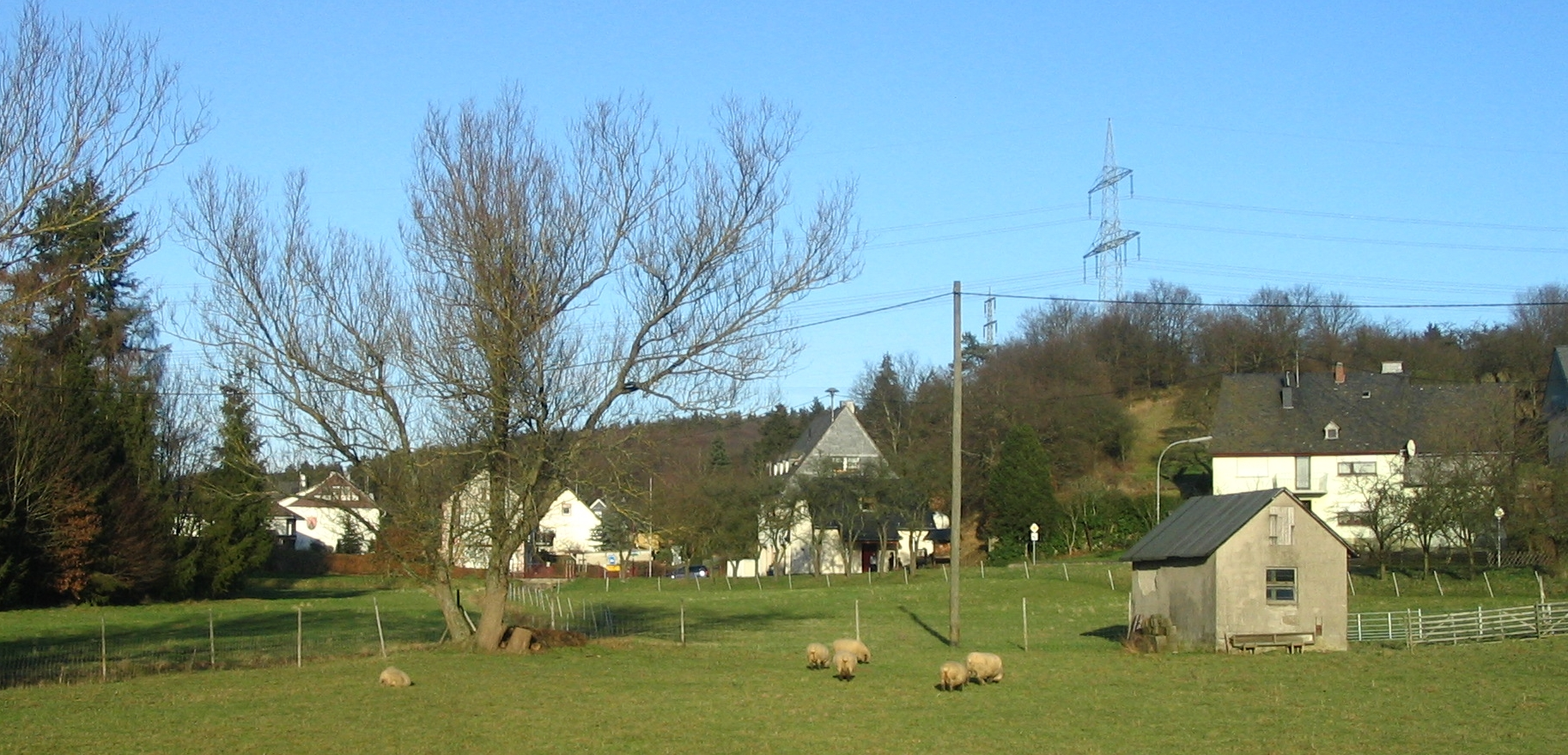
Erbach seen from the west

== Geography ==
=== Location ===
The municipality lies in the eastern Hunsrück right on the Autobahn A 61. Southeast of the village is the edge of the Binger Wald (Bingen Forest).

== History ==
Erbach belonged to the Electorate of the Palatinate Altes Gericht (“Old Court”). Beginning in 1794, Erbach lay under French rule. In 1814 it was assigned to the Kingdom of Prussia at the Congress of Vienna. Since 1947, it has been part of the then newly founded state of Rhineland-Palatinate.

=== Population development ===
What follows is a table of the municipality's population figures for selected years since the early 19th century (each time at 31 December):

Historical population

Year	Pop.	±%
1815	207	—
1835	230	+11.1%
1871	268	+16.5%
1905	165	−38.4%
1939	179	+8.5%

Year	Pop.	±%
1950	190	+6.1%
1961	184	−3.2%
1965	206	+12.0%
1970	196	−4.9%
1975	205	+4.6%

Year	Pop.	±%
1980	192	−6.3%
1985	190	−1.0%
1987	212	+11.6%
1990	210	−0.9%
1995	229	+9.0%

Year	Pop.	±%
2000	236	+3.1%
2005	238	+0.8%
2006	254	+6.7%

Source: Statistisches Landesamt Rheinland-Pfalz

== Politics ==
=== Municipal council ===
The council is made up of 6 council members, who were elected at the municipal election held on 7 June 2009, and the honorary mayor as chairman.

=== Mayor ===
Erbach's mayor is Paul Schirra.

== Culture and sightseeing ==
=== Buildings ===
The following are listed buildings or sites in Rhineland-Palatinate’s Directory of Cultural Monuments:

- Saint John the Baptist's Catholic Church (Kirche St. Johannes der Täufer), Hauptstraße – quarrystone aisleless church, 1730
