= Bergenhausen =

- Municipality
- Location of Bergenhausen within Rhein-Hunsrück-Kreis district
- Interactive map of Bergenhausen
- Location within Germany Location within Rhineland-Palatinate
- Coordinates: 50°1′27.72″N 7°34′20.11″E
- Country: Germany
- State: Rhineland-Palatinate
- District: Rhein-Hunsrück-Kreis
- Municipal assoc.: Simmern-Rheinböllen

Government
  - Mayor (2019–24): Wilhelm Enk

Area
  - Total: 2.68 km^{2} (1.03 sq mi)
- Elevation: 370 m (1,210 ft)

Population (2025-12-31)
  - Total: 112
  - Density: 41.8/km^{2} (108/sq mi)
- Time zone: UTC+01:00 (CET)
  - Summer (DST): UTC+02:00 (CEST)
- Postal codes: 55469
- Dialling codes: 06766
- Vehicle registration: SIM

Bergenhausen is an Ortsgemeinde – a municipality belonging to a Verbandsgemeinde, a kind of collective municipality – in the Rhein-Hunsrück-Kreis (district) in Rhineland-Palatinate, Germany. It belongs to the Verbandsgemeinde Simmern-Rheinböllen, whose seat is in Simmern.

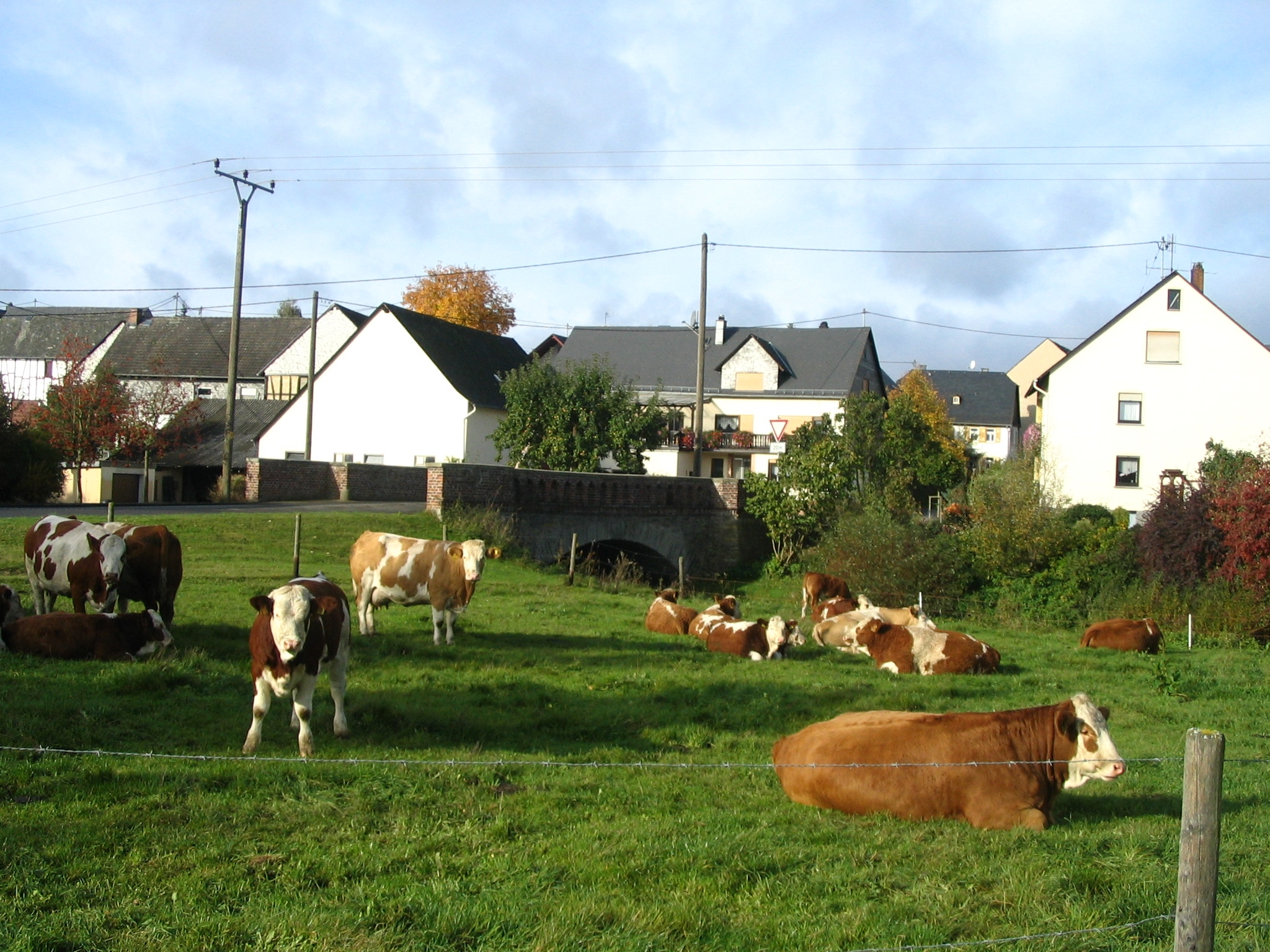
Village centre in background

== Geography ==
=== Location ===
The municipality lies in the Hunsrück on both sides of the Simmerbach.

== History ==
The village's history goes back to Roman times. In 1293, Bergenhausen had its first documentary mention. Beginning in 1794, Bergenhausen lay under French rule. In 1815 it was assigned to the Kingdom of Prussia at the Congress of Vienna. Since 1946, it has been part of the then newly founded state of Rhineland-Palatinate.

== Religion ==
The village's Evangelical congregation belongs to the parish of Pleizenhausen.

== Politics ==
=== Mayor ===
Bergenhausen's mayor is Wilhelm Enk.

== Culture and sightseeing ==
=== Buildings ===
The following are listed buildings or sites in Rhineland-Palatinate’s Directory of Cultural Monuments:

- Honigberg 2 – estate complex along the street; partly timber-frame, partly slated, 19th century; whole complex of buildings
- Kumbder Weg 1 – estate complex; timber-frame house plastered, half-hipped roof, first fourth of the 19th century, barn with two stables, latter half of the 19th century
