= Mörschbach =

- Municipality
- Coat of arms

- Location of Mörschbach within Rhein-Hunsrück-Kreis district
- Interactive map of Mörschbach
- Location within Germany Location within Rhineland-Palatinate
- Coordinates: 50°0′43″N 7°37′27″E
- Country: Germany
- State: Rhineland-Palatinate
- District: Rhein-Hunsrück-Kreis
- Municipal assoc.: Simmern-Rheinböllen

Government
  - Mayor (2019–24): Dieter Michel

Area
  - Total: 5.82 km^{2} (2.25 sq mi)
- Elevation: 430 m (1,410 ft)

Population (2025-12-31)
  - Total: 340
  - Density: 58/km^{2} (150/sq mi)
- Time zone: UTC+01:00 (CET)
  - Summer (DST): UTC+02:00 (CEST)
- Postal codes: 55494
- Dialling codes: 06764
- Vehicle registration: SIM
- Website: www.moerschbach.de

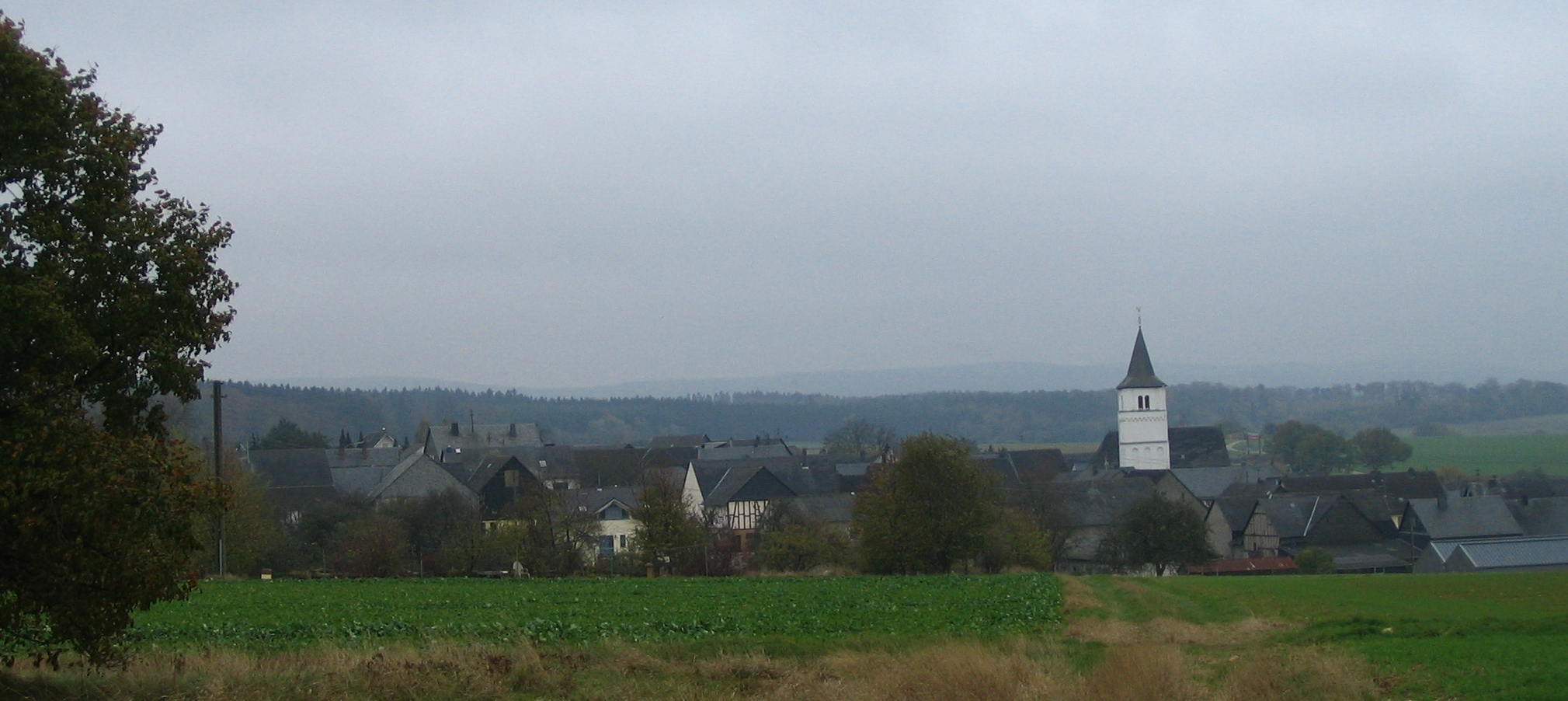
View of the village from the north

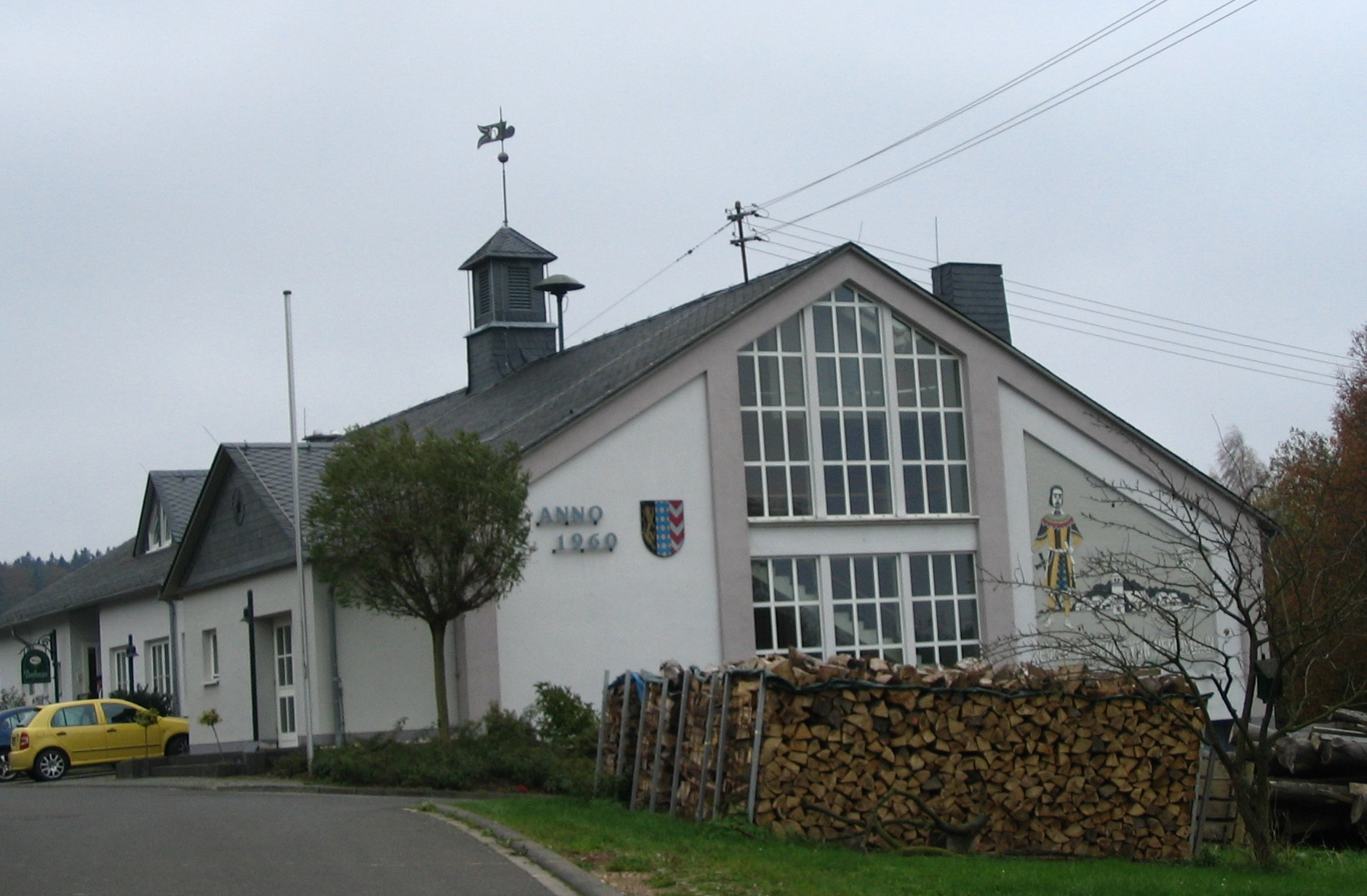
Municipal building in the village centre

Mörschbach is an Ortsgemeinde – a municipality belonging to a Verbandsgemeinde, a kind of collective municipality – in the Rhein-Hunsrück-Kreis (district) in Rhineland-Palatinate, Germany. It belongs to the Verbandsgemeinde Simmern-Rheinböllen, whose seat is in Simmern.

== Geography ==
=== Location ===
The municipality lies in the eastern Hunsrück, roughly 4 km west of Rheinböllen at the foot of the Soonwald at an elevation of 440 m above sea level. The Autobahn A 61 runs nearby. The municipal area measures 582 ha, of which 218 ha is wooded.

== History ==
Archaeological digs have yielded finds that suggest that there were settlers here as early as 500 BC. From the time when the Romans held sway, which lasted more than 400 years in this area, roads can still be made out. Such a road led from Trier by way of Wahlbach, Mörschbach and Rheinböllen to the Rhine. Grave goods, too (coins, glass urns from Emperor Augustus’s time), from barrows within Mörschbach’s limits bear witness to Roman hegemony. In 1006, Mörschbach had its first documentary mention in connection with the consecration of the Evangelical church (although at the time, it was of course Catholic, for the Reformation was still far in the future) by Archbishop Willigis of Mainz. The church’s founder and builder was the “Edle (“Noble”) Thiderich von Mergisbach”. With Archbishop Willigis’s leave, he built a church as a free landholder on his own land, and this was consecrated in 1006.

Beginning in 1794, Mörschbach lay under French rule. In 1814 it was assigned to the Kingdom of Prussia at the Congress of Vienna. Since 1946, it has been part of the then newly founded state of Rhineland-Palatinate.

In the course of village renewal, a number of measures were undertaken: The village thoroughfare was widened, the fountain square was redesigned, a new village square was built, the Wiegehäuschen (“Little Weighing House”) was renovated, a children's playground was built, and a paved carpark was laid at the municipal building (built in 1960), which itself was renovated and modernized by conversions and additions; furthermore, many trees and shrubs were planted in and around the village.

While the municipal building was being renovated from 1996 to 1998, a firefighting equipment room and a village public house were integrated into the structure. The caretaker's dwelling was enlarged, and the slaughterhouse facility and the youth room were renovated. The municipal building, with its makeover and technological equipment, has become the centerpoint for events in the village's cultural and social life.

=== Population development ===
What follows is a table of the municipality's population figures for selected years since the early 19th century (each time at 31 December):

Historical population

Year	Pop.	±%
1815	242	—
1835	309	+27.7%
1871	331	+7.1%
1905	311	−6.0%
1939	296	−4.8%
1950	306	+3.4%
1961	313	+2.3%

Year	Pop.	±%
1965	311	−0.6%
1970	302	−2.9%
1975	290	−4.0%
1980	292	+0.7%
1985	278	−4.8%
1987	289	+4.0%
1990	321	+11.1%

Year	Pop.	±%
1995	346	+7.8%
2000	351	+1.4%
2005	360	+2.6%
2006	328	−8.9%
2009	337	+2.7%

Source: Statistisches Landesamt Rheinland-Pfalz

== Religion ==
Some two thirds of the inhabitants are Evangelical and 15% are Catholic, while 20% belong to other faiths.

== Politics ==
=== Municipal council ===
The council is made up of 8 council members, who were elected by majority vote at the municipal election held on 7 June 2009, and the honorary mayor as chairman.

=== Mayor ===
Mörschbach's mayor is Dieter Michel, and his deputies are Otmar Augustin and Helga Vogt.

=== Coat of arms ===
The municipality's arms might be described thus: A pale lozengy argent and azure between sable a lion rampant sinister Or armed and langued gules and chevronny reversed of seven of the last and first.

== Culture and sightseeing ==
=== Buildings ===
The following are listed buildings or sites in Rhineland-Palatinate’s Directory of Cultural Monuments:

- Evangelical church, Rheinböllener Straße – Gothic tower, 1373, aisleless church 1761/1762
- Brunnenstraße/corner of Rheinböllener Straße – fountain, cast-iron basin, Rheinböllen Ironworks, latter half of the 19th century
- Ellerner Straße – brick wellhouse, 19th century
- Rheinböllener Straße 4 – L-shaped estate, whole complex of buildings; timber-frame house, partly solid, half-hipped roof, early 19th century; commercial wing 20th century
- Nonnenberg – mediaeval motte complex

=== Sport and leisure ===
Right near the industrial park is the sporting ground that was laid out in 1969. A clubhouse with changing rooms and showers as well as a small grandstand were built in 1976 and modernized in 1997 by conversion and renovation. Football enthusiasts from Mörschbach and Wahlbach founded the club SV 48 Brühltal Mörschbach e.V. after the Second World War, which marked its 50th anniversary in 1998. In the field of recreational sport, a dancing group was founded in 1980, and a ladies’ gymnastic group in 1985. The renovation at the municipal building, too, offers opportunities for further recreational sports.

=== Clubs ===
Mörschbach is home to a volunteer fire brigade, the sport club SV 48 Brühltal Mörschbach e.V., the “Da Capo” men's choir, a women's choir, a trombone ensemble and a local countrywomen's group. Besides club events, there is the kermis in late May, which is the village's main festival.

== Economy and infrastructure ==
Through the village runs Kreisstraße 52, and the Autobahn A 61, about 5 km away, affords the many commuters a good link in the north-south direction. Besides the two full-time agricultural operations, there are also still a few businesses in Mörschbach that work the land as a sideline. There are no longer any shops. The old bakehouse-schoolhouse nowadays serves as the town hall and assembly hall for various small events.

The old village centre is framed by new building developments: Am Bacherweg, Am Labesweg and Hinter dem Graben. In 1986, the industrial park “Am Metzenweg” was built on Mörschbach's outskirts, since which time 7 businesses have located there, and there are expansion plans.
