= Argenthal =

- Municipality
- Coat of arms

- Location of Argenthal within Rhein-Hunsrück-Kreis district
- Interactive map of Argenthal
- Location within Germany Location within Rhineland-Palatinate
- Coordinates: 49°58′32″N 7°35′56″E
- Country: Germany
- State: Rhineland-Palatinate
- District: Rhein-Hunsrück-Kreis
- Municipal assoc.: Simmern-Rheinböllen

Government
  - Mayor (2019–24): Hans-Werner Merg

Area
  - Total: 28.52 km^{2} (11.01 sq mi)
- Elevation: 458 m (1,503 ft)

Population (2025-12-31)
  - Total: 1,744
  - Density: 61.15/km^{2} (158.4/sq mi)
- Time zone: UTC+01:00 (CET)
  - Summer (DST): UTC+02:00 (CEST)
- Postal codes: 55496
- Dialling codes: 06761
- Vehicle registration: SIM
- Website: www.argenthal.de

Argenthal is an Ortsgemeinde – a municipality belonging to a Verbandsgemeinde, a kind of collective municipality – in the Rhein-Hunsrück-Kreis (district) in Rhineland-Palatinate, Germany. It belongs to the Verbandsgemeinde Simmern-Rheinböllen, whose seat is in Simmern.

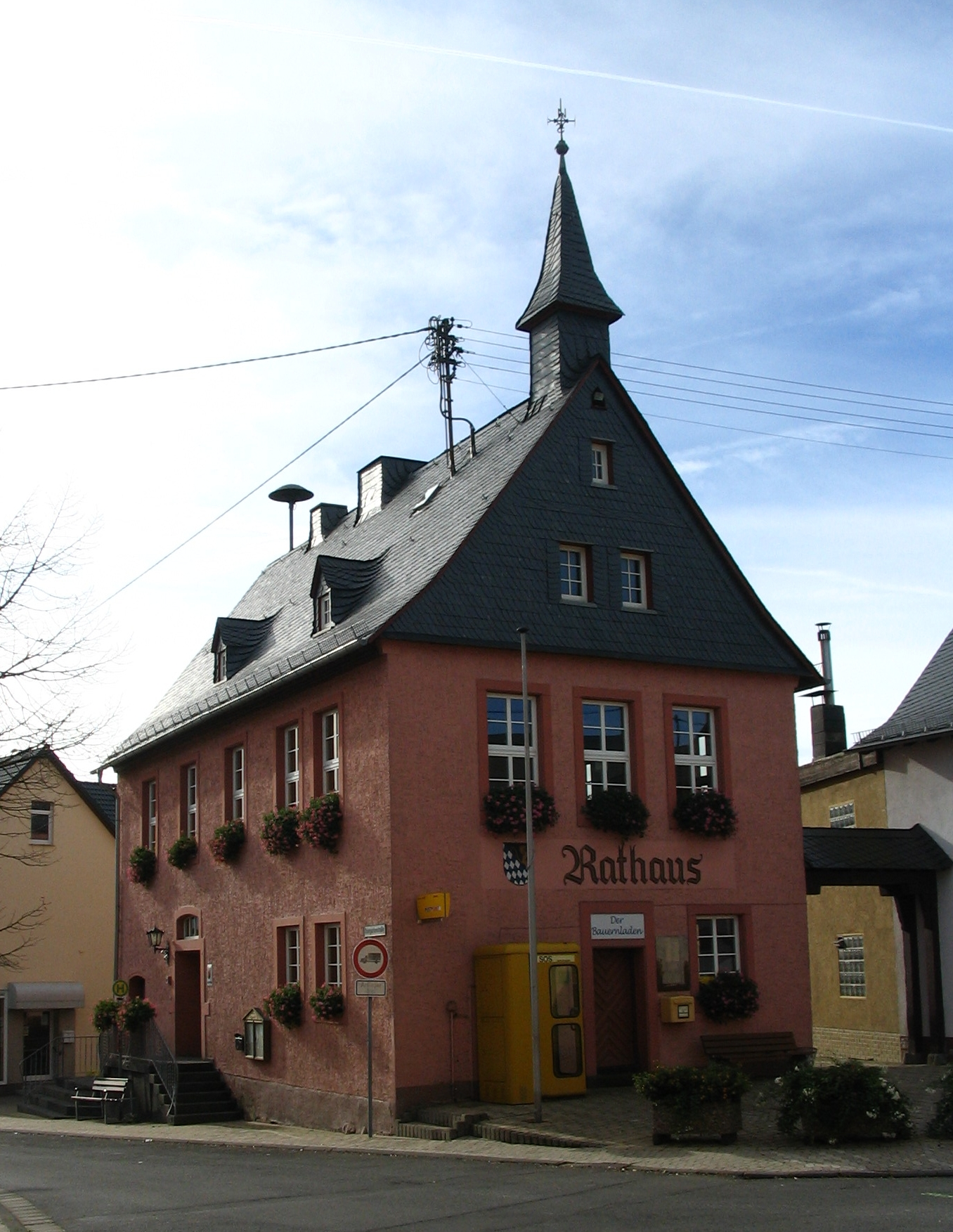
Town hall in the village centre

== Geography ==
=== Location ===
Argenthal lies on the northwest edge of the Soonwald, a heavily wooded section of the west-central Hunsrück, which reaches an elevation of 657 m above sea level and is part of the Rhenish Massif. Major centres in the nearby area are Simmern to the west and Rheinböllen to the east.

Argenthal's highest elevation is the Schanzerkopf at 643 m above sea level. Also within municipal limits is the Waldsee, a bathing pond that arose from an old ore strip mine that was shut down in 1935.

Argenthal is one of the bigger centres in the Hunsrück in which only a few people still work the land. Most of the municipality's inhabitants earn livelihoods as blue- or white-collar workers, officials, handcrafters, business operators and soldiers.

=== Municipal area’s extent ===
With a total surface area of 28.52 km^{2}, of which 19.85 km^{2} is wooded (the Soonwald), Argenthal's municipal area is, after Boppard’s, the district’s second biggest.

== History ==
In 1091, the municipality had its first documentary mention as Argantal. The overlord was the Count Palatine of the Rhine. Beginning in 1794, Argenthal lay under French rule. In 1815 it was assigned to the Kingdom of Prussia at the Congress of Vienna. Since 1946, it has been part of the then newly founded state of Rhineland-Palatinate.

=== Population development ===
The following table shows the development of Argenthal’s population (figures for 31 December each time):

Historical population

Year	Pop.	±%
1815	730	—
1835	880	+20.5%
1871	792	−10.0%
1905	851	+7.4%
1939	849	−0.2%

Year	Pop.	±%
1950	1,023	+20.5%
1961	1,091	+6.6%
1965	1,238	+13.5%
1970	1,394	+12.6%
1975	1,444	+3.6%

Year	Pop.	±%
1980	1,436	−0.6%
1985	1,432	−0.3%
1987	1,479	+3.3%
1990	1,526	+3.2%
1995	1,557	+2.0%

Year	Pop.	±%
2000	1,578	+1.3%
2005	1,660	+5.2%
2009	1,627	−2.0%
2021	1,661	+2.1%

Source: Statistisches Landesamt Rheinland-Pfalz

== Politics ==
=== Municipal council ===
The council is made up of 16 council members, who were elected at the municipal election held on 7 June 2009, and the honorary mayor as chairman.

The municipal election held on 7 June 2009 yielded the following results:

	SPD	WG	Total
2009	7	9	16 seats

=== Mayor ===
Argenthal's mayor is Hans-Werner Merg.

=== Coat of arms ===
The German blazon reads: Im schräggeteilten Schild vorne von Blau und Silber schräg gerautet, hinten ein rot bewehrter und -gezungter Löwe nach rechts.

The municipality's arms might in English heraldic language be described thus: Per bend bendy lozengy argent and azure, and sable a lion rampant sinister Or armed and langued gules.

The “bendy lozengy” pattern on the dexter (armsbearer's right, viewer's left) side stands for the Duke of Bavaria, a former overlord, while the charge on the sinister (armsbearer's left, viewer's right) side, the lion rampant sinister (called “sinister” because he faces the armsbearer's left) likewise refers to a former overlord, in this case the Count Palatine of the Rhine.

The arms have been borne since 9 December 1980.

== Culture and sightseeing ==
=== Buildings ===
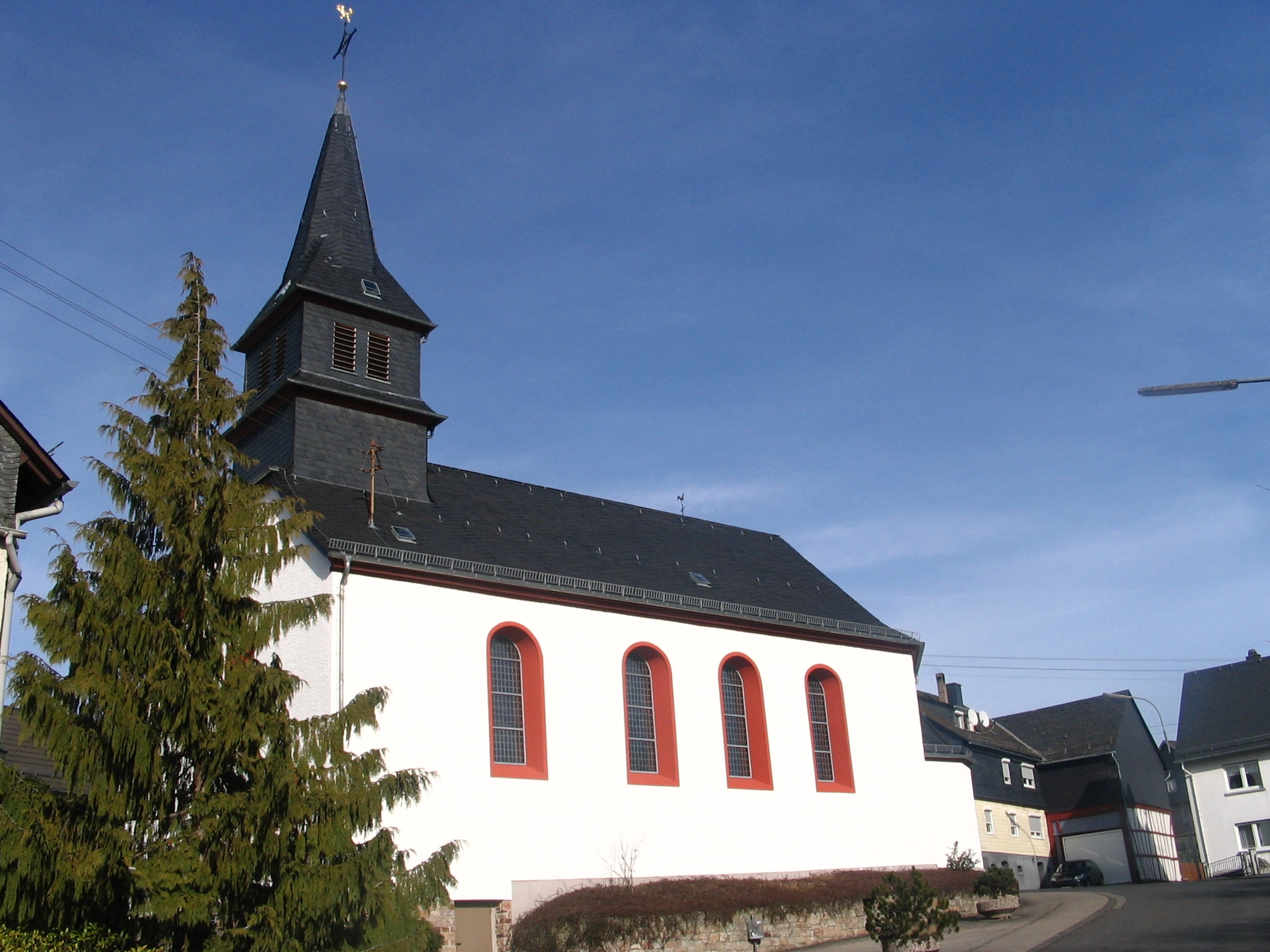
Turmgasse 6: Evangelical church

The following are listed buildings or sites in Rhineland-Palatinate’s Directory of Cultural Monuments:

- Evangelical church, Turmgasse 6 – aisleless church, 1770, west tower and lengthening marked 1852; graveyard; warriors’ memorial, sandstone pillar with relief, Palatine-Bavarian coat of arms; whole complex
- Saint John the Baptist's Catholic Church (branch church; Filialkirche St. St. Johannes Baptist), Aulergasse 1 – aisleless church, 1826, sacristy addition from latter half of the 19th century, lengthening 1949
- On Bundesstraße 50 going towards Simmern – milestone; Prussian basalt obelisk, first third of the 19th century

=== Sport and leisure ===
In the summer, the municipality and its outlying area offers hiking and cycling in the vast Soonwald and swimming and recreation at the Waldsee. In the winter, the Schanzerkopf with its sledding slope is a popular outing destination, especially for families with children.

== Economy and infrastructure ==
The well developed local infrastructure and the short distance to the district seat of Simmern and Frankfurt-Hahn Airport, which is currently enjoying an upswing, favour the municipality as a living place, as do the links to Bundesstraße 50 and the Autobahn A 61 leading to the state capital, Mainz, and the Frankfurt Rhine Main Region. In 1996, Bundesstraße 50 was widened and also realigned so that it now no longer runs through the village, but rather bypasses it as a four-lane highway.
