= Rheinböllen =

- Town
- Coat of arms

- Location of Rheinböllen within Rhein-Hunsrück-Kreis district
- Interactive map of Rheinböllen
- Location within Germany Location within Rhineland-Palatinate
- Coordinates: 50°00′N 07°40′E
- Country: Germany
- State: Rhineland-Palatinate
- District: Rhein-Hunsrück-Kreis
- Municipal assoc.: Simmern-Rheinböllen

Government
  - Mayor (2019–24): Bernadette Jourdant (CDU)

Area
  - Total: 16.36 km^{2} (6.32 sq mi)
- Elevation: 409 m (1,342 ft)

Population (2025-12-31)
  - Total: 4,341
  - Density: 265.3/km^{2} (687.2/sq mi)
- Time zone: UTC+01:00 (CET)
  - Summer (DST): UTC+02:00 (CEST)
- Postal codes: 55494
- Dialling codes: 06764
- Vehicle registration: SIM
- Website: www.rheinboellen.info

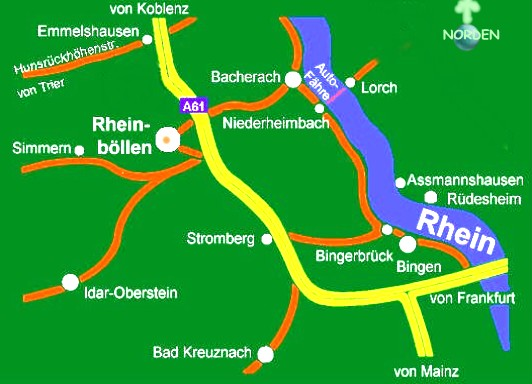
Rheinböllen regional locator map

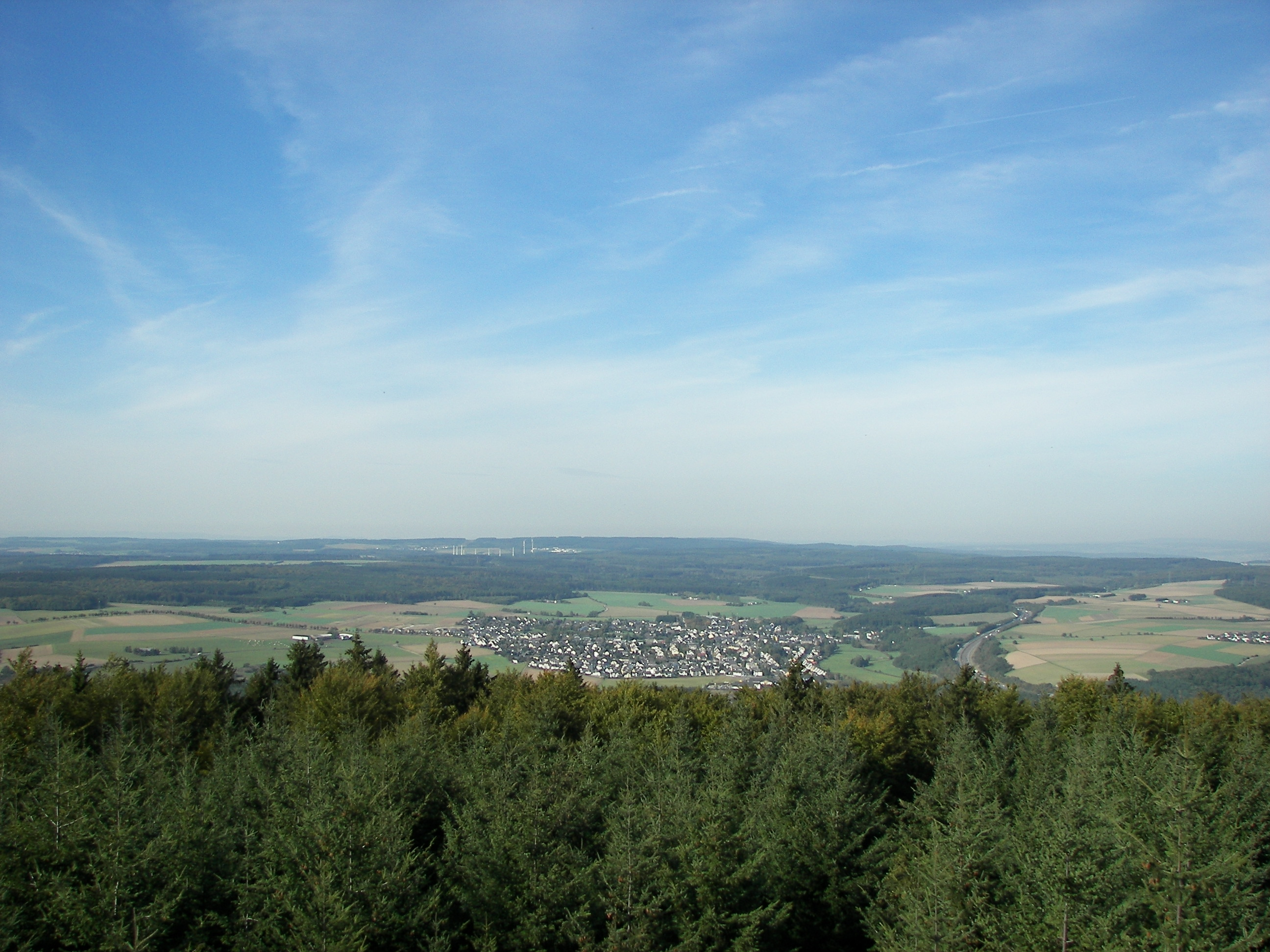
Rheinböllen

Rheinböllen (German pronunciation: [ˈʁaɪnˌbœlən]) is a town in the Rhein-Hunsrück-Kreis (district) in Rhineland-Palatinate, Germany. It belongs to the Verbandsgemeinde Simmern-Rheinböllen, whose seat is in Simmern. It was the seat of the former Verbandsgemeinde Rheinböllen.

== Geography ==
=== Location ===
Rheinböllen lies some 10 km as the crow flies southwest of the Middle Rhine at Bacharach in the southeast Hunsrück. The town is found in the transitional zone between (to the east) the Binger Wald (Bingen Forest) and (to the south) the Soonwald, a heavily wooded section of the west-central Hunsrück that since 2005 has belonged to the Naturpark Soonwald-Nahe.

=== Constituent communities ===
Rheinböllen has two outlying Stadtteile: Kleinweidelbach and Rheinböllerhütte.

=== Climate ===
Yearly precipitation in Rheinböllen amounts to 695 mm. This falls into the middle third of the precipitation chart for all Germany. Only at 39% of the German Weather Service's weather stations are lower figures recorded. The driest month is February. The most rainfall comes in June. In that month, precipitation is 1.6 times what it is in February. Precipitation varies only slightly. Only at 2% of the weather stations are lower seasonal swings recorded.

== Name ==
The prefix Rhein— suggests some kind of historical dependence on Bacharach, to whose Vogtei Rheinböllen may well once have belonged, before it passed to the Counts Palatine. The past teacher and local historian Junges traced Bollen to an old word meaning "hill" or "height", leading to the interpretation of the name as meaning “Rhine Heights" (an apt description of the location, up on the Hunsrück). Through the ages, the name for Rheinböllen has taken many spellings: Rinbul, Rinbulle, Rynbuhel, Reynbullen, Rymbul, Rymbulen, Rynbule, Rinbelle, Bollen, Bullen, Rinbulde, Rheinbullen.

== History ==
The Rheinböllen region was settled as early as the Stone Age. Shortly after 1900, workmen digging near the railway station found a sharpened, polished stone axe, the earliest evidence of human habitation in what is now the town. Archaeological finds in the area of the Altdorf ("Old Village", a triangle formed by the streets Simmerner Straße, Poststraße and Bahnhofstraße) point to Celtic beginnings. The Romans later drove a road through the settlement.

Street names used today, such as Wehr ("Defence") and Hinterster Graben ("Hindmost Moat") bear witness to a girding wall that once stood around the village. Rheinböllen was secured with two wall moats. An illustration from 1620 shows palisades on the wall, which itself had a defensive tower built into it.

Rheinböllen was the main centre in the so-called "Old Court" (Altes Gericht), the ancient core of Comital-Palatine lordship on the Hundisrück. Ellern, Erbach (in part), Dichtelbach and Kleinweidelbach, too, might also have been part of it. This "Old Court" likely had arisen by 1142, when Hermann von Stahleck was awarded the County Palatine by his brother-in-law, King Conrad III. The places within this landholding all lay in the archdeaconry of the Mainz Cathedral Provost's office, and thereby likely in the Nahegau. In the east, it bordered on Saint Peter's Parish, Bacharach, to which Rheinböllen definitely belonged, at least ecclesiastically.

After Hermann von Stahleck's death, Emperor Barbarossa transferred the County Palatine in 1156 to his stepbrother Konrad, who also held rights to estates in the Nahegau, to which Rheinböllen also almost certainly belonged.

The oldest known document about the town is a lease, dated 1 May 1309, concluded by Johann von dem Stein, serving as the Burgrave at Böckelheim, and the Schultheiß of Rheinböllen. The Burgrave held two fields in the Bischofsfeld as a Palatine fief, and transferred them to the municipality.

Rheinböllen was apparently a town once before. In 1316, the settlement was recorded as being an oppidum, the Latin word used in Roman times for any centre resembling a town, and in historical records made as late as the 13th and 14th centuries, it was still appearing in this meaning, describing mediaeval towns.

Emperor Louis the Bavarian and his elder brother Rudolf shared between themselves ownership of the Rhenish Palatinate. To curry the Rhenish princes' favour, Louis pledged, right after his regency began in 1314, the Altes Gericht together with Castle Fürstenberg and the settlements of Diebach and Manubach to Archbishop of Mainz Peter. Two years thereafter, Louis transferred half the village to Archbishop of Trier Baldwin, and another four years later to King John of Bohemia, Baldwin's nephew, whereupon the other half of the village was now given to the Archbishop. The settlement was a main centre in the County Palatine – and was likely at that time said to be a town – until 1359, through a pledge of 1,800 Florentine guilders, Simmern became part of the holding and was later raised to seat of the Amt.

As early as the 12th century, Rheinböllen supposedly had a marketplace within its walls. There is evidence that Rudolf II, Count Palatine of the Rhine granted market rights between 1314 and 1347. Markets have been part of Rheinböllen ever since. Livestock markets were still being held at the outbreak of the Second World War on the "Sauwasen" (the plot of land where the primary school now stands), and each year, there is still a craft market on Kermis Tuesday.

Rheinböllen's landholders changed often in the 14th and 15th centuries. Under the 1338 Palatine Partition among Rudolf II, Rupert the Younger and Rupert the Elder, the lordship over Rheinböllen changed once again: the two Ruperts – their name was "Ruprecht" in German – became the new lords. In the same year, King Louis forwent all claims to, among other things, the "half" of Rheinböllen, referring the pledgeholders, John of Bohemia and Archbishop Baldwin, to Count Palatine Rudolf and the two Ruperts. In 1352, Rupert I, Elector Palatine enfeoffed the Electorate of Trier with half of Rheinböllen.

The court at Rheinböllen existed already by 1359 and was held on the plot of land where the Catholic church now stands. On the neighbouring "Henkersbitz" (Henker is German for "hangman") stood the gallows. In 1886, when excavation was being done for the church that was to be built there, workers unearthed, among other things, bones and skulls – all that was left of those hanged on the "Henkersbitz".

About 1400, the Counts Palatine had enfeoffed several knightly families with parts of their Rheinböllen holdings, namely the families Knebel von Katzenelnbogen, von Crampurg, von Leyen, Futtersack von Steeg, Breitscheit von Richenstein and Hune von Bacharach. Even a family called the Knights of Rymbulle (Rheinböllen) crop up in documents from 1361 to 1389, although it is unknown whether or in what way they were linked with the town. Squire Dietrich von Rymbulle was also the fiefholder of the Sponheim Castle Kastellaun.

Two centuries later, Rheinböllen belonged to the Electorate of the Palatinate and had 48 hearths (for which, read "households"). At that time in history, about 1600, many Palatinate lordships owned meadows within town limits: Anthonius Kratz von Scharfenstein, Antonius Waldbott zu Bassenheim, Friedrich Hundt von Seilen, Christoph von Stein, Hans Henrich von Schmidtburg zu Gemünden, Michel von Kallenfels, Hans Knebel von Katzenelnbogen, Hans Christoph von Grorode, the family von Koppenstein and Hans Caspar von Sponheim.

At the end of the Middle Ages, Rheinböllen was a postal station on the route between Innsbruck and Mechelen, nowadays in Austria and Belgium respectively. An 18th-century geographical description explains that the road coming from Bacharach went through the market town. The reader furthermore learns something about the Palatinate woodlands, the iron-ore mining in the Ledenwald (forest) and the Guldenbach (brook), which has this name only from Rheinböllen on down, being called the Volkenbach farther upstream.

By the late 17th century at the latest, Rheinböllen was a Schultheißerei together with Dichtelbach and Erbach. In the 18th century, Electorate of the Palatinate posted the local tollkeeper who collected the road tolls.

In 1794, Emperor Napoleon annexed the Rhine's left bank, which would remain French for two decades. The Bürgermeisterei ("Mayoralty") of Rheinböllen thereby became the Mairie (also "Mayoralty") of Rheinböllen. The brewer and innkeeper Johann Jakob Mades served as maire (mayor). In 1804, the French emperor visited the Hunsrück in person, and young citizens from Rheinböllen, Dichtelbach, Ellern, Mörschbach and Kleinweidelbach had to ride out to meet him.

When allied troops crossed the Rhine on New Year's Night 1813–1814 near Kaub, France's hegemony in the region fell, and the Rhineland became Prussian. On the day that followed, New Year's Day 1814, Prince William, Field Marshal Blücher and Field Marshal Gneisenau rested at the Evangelical rectory for a few hours.

After the Congress of Vienna, the earlier Mairies of Argenthal and Rheinböllen, along with Liebshausen, were merged to form the Prussian Amt of Rheinböllen. Friedrich Mades, Johann Jakob Mades's son, became the mayor and served in that capacity until his death in 1851 – 35 years all together.

Less than a century later, the village lived the blackest day in its history. On 16 March 1945, the Second World War was in its death throes, at least in Europe. On this morning, a handful of SS men rather ill-advisedly decided to try to hold off the American advance on Rheinböllen, and to that end, destroyed an American tank. By way of response, the remaining tanks, supported by artillery, let loose a furious barrage on Rheinböllen. Some 25 properties did not survive the onslaught and were utterly destroyed. All that was left standing of the Evangelical church was the surrounding wall. The Catholic church's tower, too, was struck, but somehow managed to stay standing. Amazingly, only one citizen was killed, but thirty families were left homeless on this day.

After the war, Rheinböllen's skyline changed lastingly owing to steady growth. In rapid succession, one building zone after another sprang up, and the population rose sharply. In 1946, the year when Rheinböllen became part of the then newly founded state of Rhineland-Palatinate, there were 1,283 inhabitants. By 1985, this had risen threefold (3,661). The figure is now just under 4,000.

On 1 January 1969, one section of the municipality of Daxweiler with 70 inhabitants was transferred to Rheinböllen. On 17 March 1974, the hitherto self-administering municipality of Kleinweidelbach with 113 inhabitants was amalgamated with Rheinböllen. On 5 September 2009, Rheinböllen was raised to town by the Rhineland-Palatinate state government.

=== Former Jewish presence ===
Until the time of the "Thousand-Year Reich", Rheinböllen was among the places in the Simmern district that had considerable Jewish populations. The earliest trace of Jewish settlement in the town goes back to the mid 19th century. In 1842, seventeen "Israelite" (so the document styles them) children were attending the Catholic school. The oldest gravestone that can be deciphered at the Jewish graveyard on the road to Bacharach gives 11 September 1867 as Gottlieb Rauner's date of death. About 1900, there were eight Jewish families in town, all of whom earned livelihoods in retail business or trade. Older people in Rheinböllen can still remember names such as Hessel, Michels, Süßmann, Keller, Grünewald and Kann. The only Jewish institution in the municipality was a small synagogue on Bacharacher Straße. It is preserved. The memorial plaque there tells of the time in the town's history that was brought to an abrupt end by the Nazis.

=== Population development ===
What follows is a table of the town's population figures for selected years since the early 19th century (each time at 31 December):

Historical population

Year	Pop.	±%
1815	987	—
1835	1,306	+32.3%
1871	1,255	−3.9%
1905	1,343	+7.0%
1939	1,288	−4.1%
1950	1,570	+21.9%
1961	1,869	+19.0%

Year	Pop.	±%
1965	2,129	+13.9%
1970	2,652	+24.6%
1975	2,567	−3.2%
1980	2,819	+9.8%
1985	2,908	+3.2%
1987	3,075	+5.7%
1990	3,329	+8.3%

Year	Pop.	±%
1995	3,739	+12.3%
2000	3,995	+6.8%
2005	4,042	+1.2%
2006	4,035	−0.2%
2007	4,005	−0.7%
2008	3,975	−0.7%
2009	3,960	−0.4%

Source: Statistisches Landesamt Rheinland-Pfalz

== Politics ==
=== Town council ===
The council is made up of 20 council members, who were elected by proportional representation at the municipal election held on 7 June 2009, and the honorary mayor as chairman.

The municipal election held on 7 June 2009 yielded the following results:

	SPD	CDU	FWG	Total
2009	8	8	4	20 seats

=== Mayor ===
Rheinböllen's mayor is Bernadette Jourdant (formerly Oberthür), and her deputies are Bernd Raab, Siegmund Kappel and Erich Rott.

=== Coat of arms ===
The German blazon reads: In Schwarz ein wachsender goldener, rotgezungter und -bewehrter ¾ Löwe.

The town's arms might in English heraldic language be described thus: Sable, issuant from base a lion rampant Or armed and langued gules.

Rheinböllen was the main centre in the so-called "Old Court" (Altes Gericht), the old Comital-Palatine holding on the Hunsrück. The lion "issuant from base" (a lion rampant is usually centred in the field with his whole body showing) is a "diminutive" of the Palatine Lion first borne by the House of Wittelsbach after they were enfeoffed with the County Palatine of the Rhine in 1214.

The arms have been borne since 18 May 1966.

== Culture and sightseeing ==
=== Buildings ===
The following are listed buildings or sites in Rhineland-Palatinate's Directory of Cultural Monuments:

==== Rheinböllen (main centre) ====
- Evangelical church, Bacharacher Straße 10 – Baroque aisleless church, 1764/1765, extension 1845/1846, tower substructure possibly mediaeval; balustrade wall around the church, 18th century; at the head of the quire the Utsch-Puricelli family tomb with Carl Puricelli's Classicist tomb; monumental zone with possible former rectory and school (Marktstraße 13)
- Saint Erasmus's Catholic Parish Church (Pfarrkirche St. Erasmus), Kirchgasse 4 – Gothic Revival hall church, brick, 1870–1872; monumental zone with Catholic rectory (Kirchgasse 5) and former school (Kirchgasse 3)
- (Before) Am Markt 1 – fountain, Classicist sandstone pylon, cast-iron basin, 1840
- Am Markt 1 – old town hall; Gothic Revival brick building, 1873
- Bacharacher Straße 8 – possible former rectory; timber-frame house, partly solid or slated, 1730–1733
- Bacharacher Straße 11, former orphanage, Puricelli’sche Stiftung (monumental zone) – group of buildings enclosed by a wall: gate marked 18??; former orphanage, Gothic Revival quarrystone building, 1862–1864; Chapel of the Immaculate Conception, three-naved quarrystone building, 1887/1888, rich Gothic Revival décor; former hospital, quarrystone building; timber-frame administration building, garden (see also below)
- Kirchgasse – cross, 18th century
- Kirchgasse 3 – former school; great timber-frame house, partly solid or slated, 1780
- Liebshausener Straße, graveyard – quarrystone chapel, 19th century; Gothic Revival Puricelli tomb, Utsch tomb, about 1860; tomb for ?, about 1844; block with vase and cloth; Illades tomb, about 1851; Smirdainiskow tomb, cast-iron, Rheinböllen Ironworks, latter half of the 19th century; fountain basin, cast-iron, Rheinböllen Ironworks, latter half of the 19th century
- Simmerner Straße/corner of Poststraße – Puricelli tomb chapel; Gothic Revival brick building, marked 1891
- Wehrstraße 8 – wellhouse, brick building; cast-iron hand pump, Rheinböllen Ironworks, latter half of the 19th century
- Hochsteinchen lookout tower, south of town on the "Hochsteinchen" – iron construction, 1893
- Jewish graveyard, Auf dem Rockenberg (monumental zone) – founded in 1845, some 20 gravestones from 1852 to 1935

==== Kleinweidelbach ====
- Kleinweidelbach 7, bakehouse and community centre – quarrystone building, 18th century

==== Rheinböllerhütte ====
- Rheinböllen Ironworks (monumental zone) – formerly the most important ironworks in the Soonwald, known from the 9th century, foundry witnessed from 1598, in late 18th century taken over by the Brothers Puricelli; group of buildings from the 1830s/1840s and 1880s/1890s (new management house, old storage hall, gatehouse/magazine, so-called casino, houses, former gardener's house and bridge) as well as the family Puricelli's Saint Mary's and Saint Michael's Crypt Chapel (see next entry)
- Teves-Straße – family Puricelli's crypt chapel (Gruftkkapelle St. Maria und St. Michael der Familie Puricelli); quarrystone aisleless church, 1857, expansion with triconch apses and crossing tower, 1906, architect Eduard Endler, Cologne
- Teves-Straße 6–8 – house, latter half of the 19th century
- Teves-Straße 20 – gatehouse/magazine; one-floor quarrystone building with clocktower, about 1830/1840; bridge, about 1840
- Teves-Straße 21 – Late Classicist two-winged building, 1860
- Teves-Straße 24 – so-called casino; former plastered house, hewn-stone building with knee wall, latter half of the 19th century
- Teves-Straße 30 – former gardener's house; one-floor building with hipped mansard roof, timber framing plastered, 18th or 19th century; quarrystone barn, partly timber-frame, half-hipped roof, 19th century; bridge, mid 19th century

At the Kulturhaus in Rheinböllen (KiR, "Culture House in Rheinböllen"), there are regular cultural festivities. Rheinböllen also has a waterpark and a 500-hectare game farm.

=== Puricelli Foundation ===
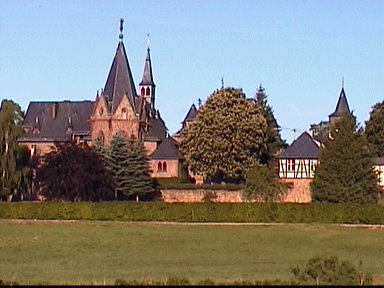
Puricelli Foundation, Rheinböllen

The Puricelli’sche Stiftung (Puricelli Foundation) was built between 1864 and 1891 and today stands under monumental protection, and is also protected by the Hague Convention. The Puricelli Foundation was formerly an orphanage with a lovely Gothic Revival chapel. The endowment came from Mr. and Mrs. Puricelli.

The Foundation's goal is to maintain its institution and building, which in great part are under monumental protection and worthy of being considered monuments and stand as cultural icons far beyond their home region (especially the chapel with its fixtures and paraments), and, for public and social purposes, especially accommodating and caring for the elderly, those who need care and the handicapped, to put itself at their disposal, as well as to present the whole complex's importance to art history and cultural history with its equipment and furnishings.

On 1 November 2006, the Franziskanerbrüder, Betriebs u. Beschäftigungs gGmbh (“Franciscan Brothers, Operation and Activity Not-for-Profit Corporation”) took over sponsorship of the nursing home in Rheinböllen. The institution serves as a home for those with physical illnesses. Its name is Puricelli-Stift Rheinböllen.

=== Regular events ===
In Rheinböllen, regular events such as Christmas markets and a kermis (church consecration festival) are held. The biggest disco event in Rheinböllen is the XMAS-DANCE-PARTY (so called even in German) staged by JuKu e.V. (Jugend- und Kulturverein – "Youth and Culture Club"). This event is always held shortly before Christmas at the Kulturhaus in Rheinböllen and each year has about 1,000 guests.

== Economy and infrastructure ==
Rheinböllen has its own interchange on the Autobahn A 61 and is 15 km by road from Bacharach on the Rhine, and also roughly 50 km from both Mainz and Koblenz.

=== Rheinböllen munitions depot ===
The Bundeswehr munitions depot, which lies south of town at the foot of the Hochsteinchen, has an area of 130 ha and 120 attendants. It has a siding on the Hunsrückquerbahn (railway). On 1 April 2004, the complex was downgraded from main munitions depot to depot/storage facility. Within the framework of the Bundeswehr's structural reform, the depot is to be fully shut down in 2011.

== Famous people ==
=== Sons and daughters of the town ===
- Friedrich Wilhelm Utsch (1732–1795), hereditary forester to the Elector of Mainz; said to be the Jäger aus Kurpfalz ("Hunter from the Palatinate"), the subject of a well-known folksong.

=== Famous people associated with the town ===
- Leonhard Goffiné (1648–1719), Premonstratensian Canon and religious folk writer; was pastor in Rheinböllen in the 17th century
- Eduard Puricelli (1826–1893), entrepreneur and member of the Reichstag of the North German Confederation.
