= Boppard =

Boppard Boppard am Rhein
- Town
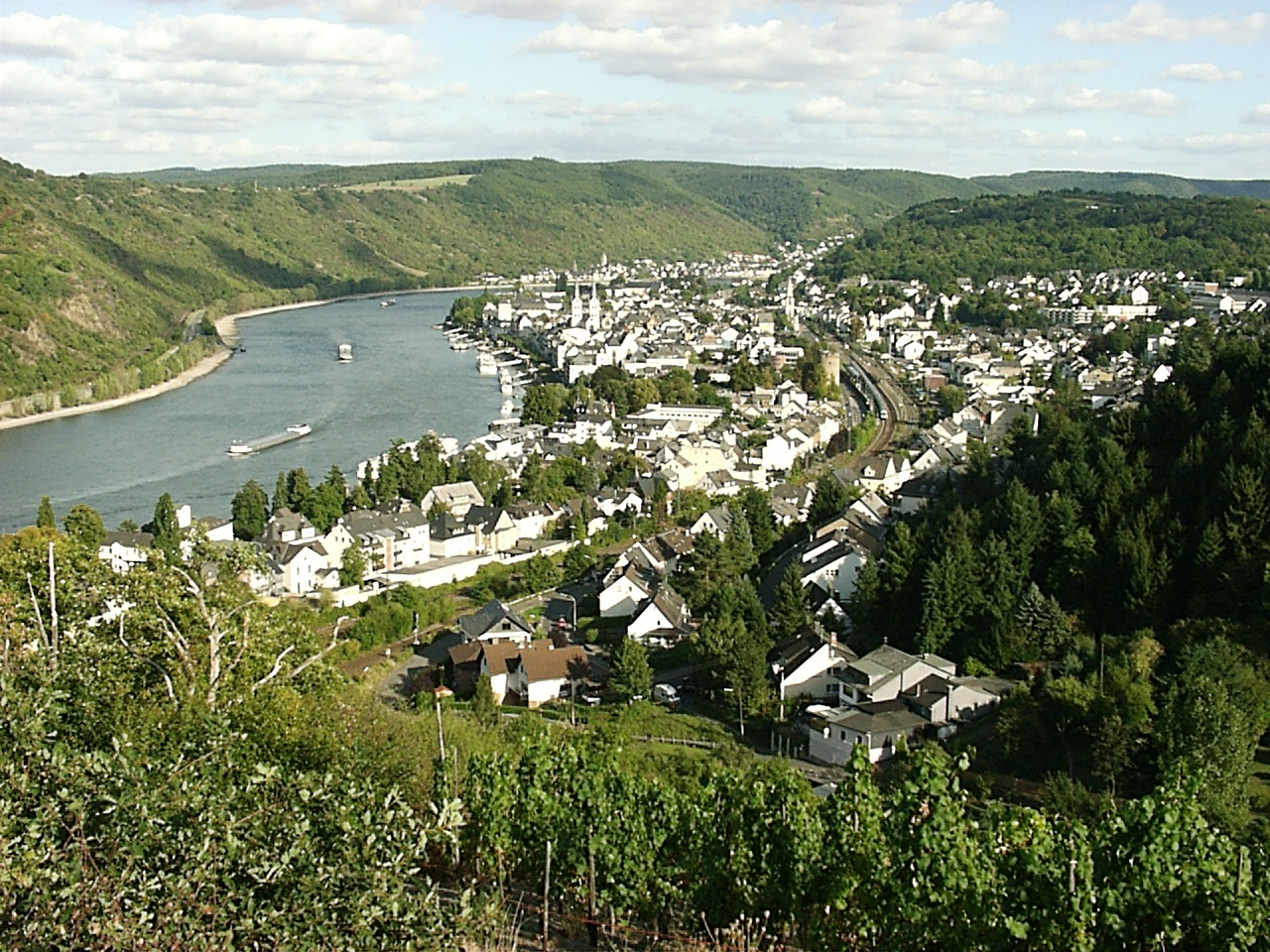
- Boppard

- Coat of arms

- Location of Boppard within Rhein-Hunsrück-Kreis district
- Interactive map of Boppard
- Location within Germany Location within Rhineland-Palatinate
- Coordinates: 50°13′53″N 7°35′27″E
- Country: Germany
- State: Rhineland-Palatinate
- District: Rhein-Hunsrück-Kreis
- Subdivisions: 10

Government
  - Mayor (2021–29): Jörg Haseneier (CDU)

Area
  - Total: 74.88 km^{2} (28.91 sq mi)
- Elevation: 74 m (243 ft)

Population (2025-12-31)
  - Total: 15,665
  - Density: 209.2/km^{2} (541.8/sq mi)
- Time zone: UTC+01:00 (CET)
  - Summer (DST): UTC+02:00 (CEST)
- Postal codes: 56154
- Dialling codes: 06741, 06742, 06745
- Vehicle registration: SIM
- Website: www.boppard.de

Boppard (German pronunciation: [ˈbɔpaʁt]), formerly also spelled Boppart, is a town and municipality (since the 1976 inclusion of 9 neighbouring villages, Ortsbezirken) in the Rhein-Hunsrück-Kreis (district) in Rhineland-Palatinate, Germany, lying in the Rhine Gorge, a UNESCO World Heritage Site. The town is also a state-recognized tourism resort (Fremdenverkehrsort) and is a winegrowing centre.

== Geography ==
=== Location ===
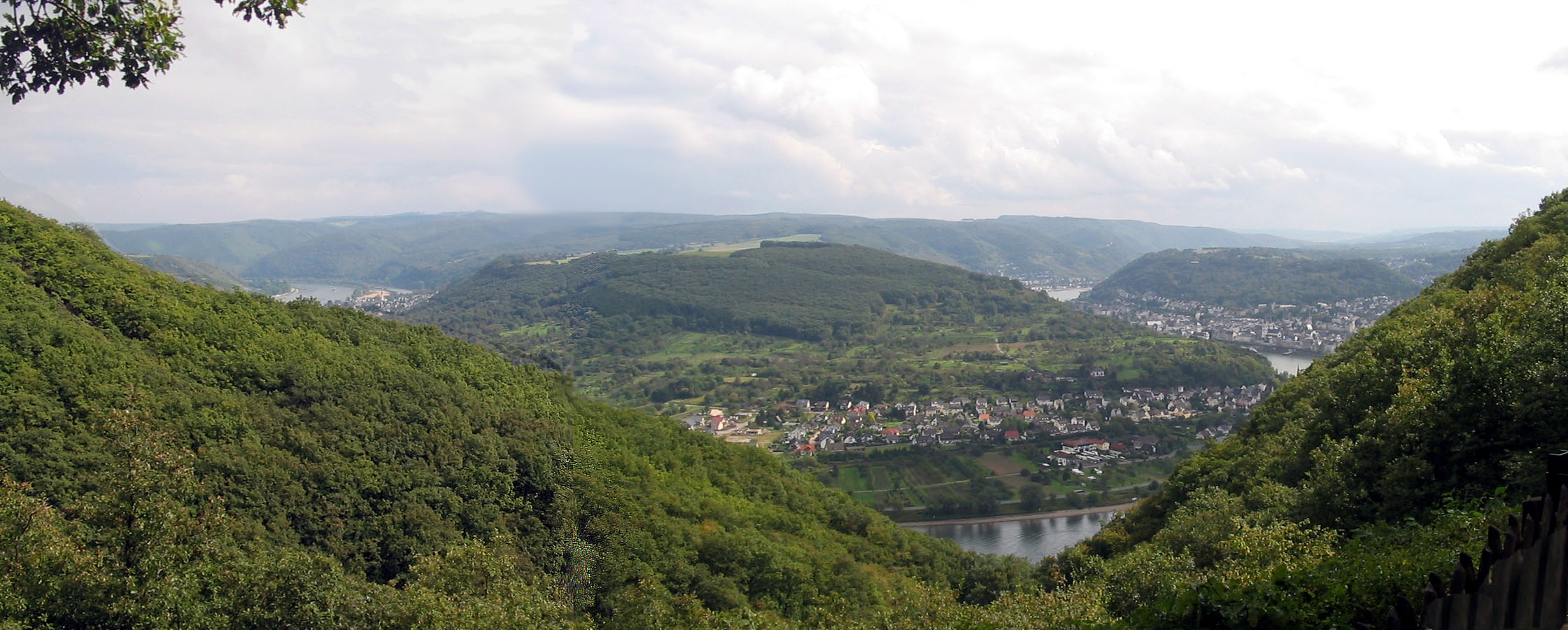
View from the Vierseenblick.

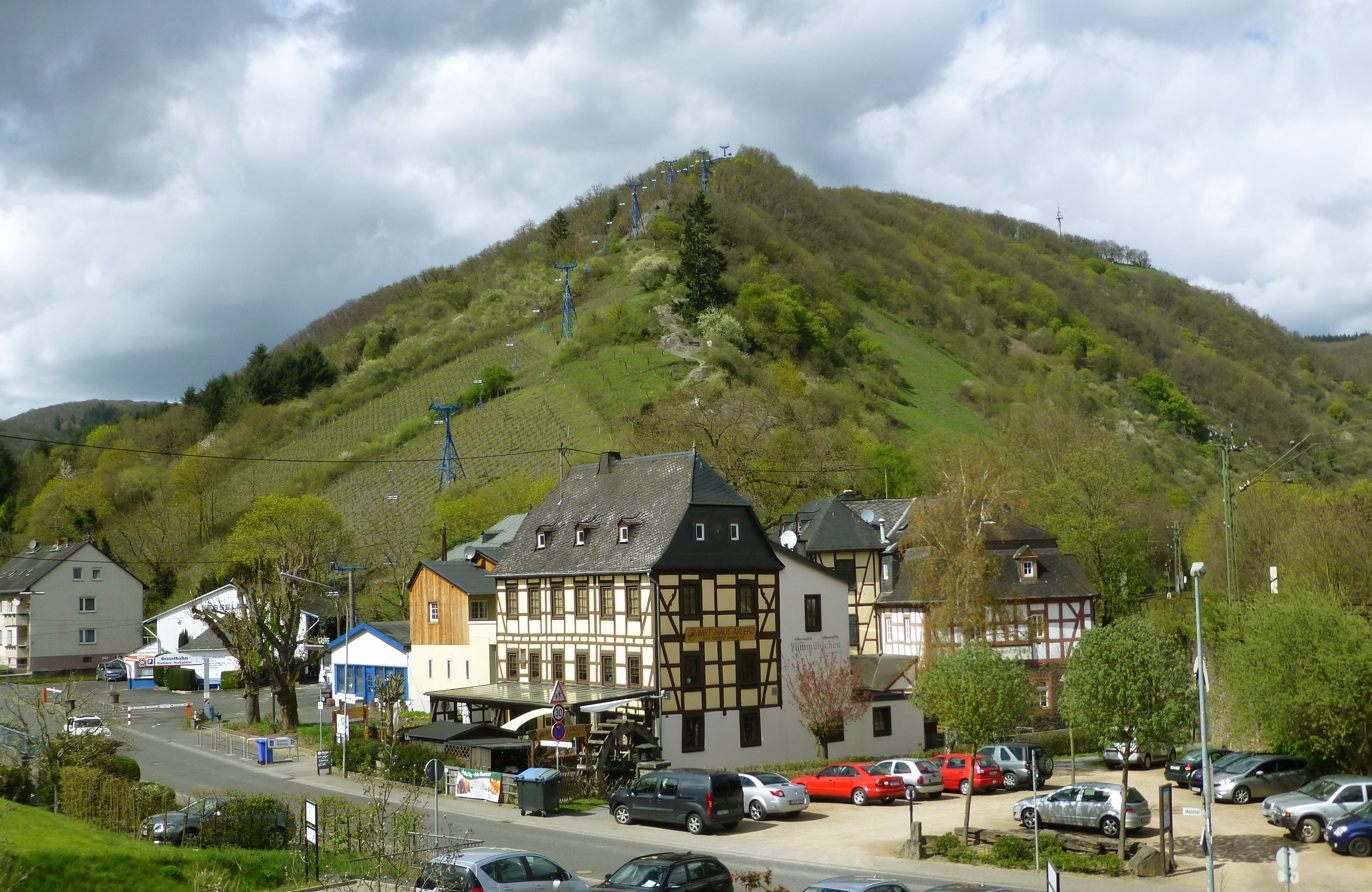
The Vierseenblick chairlift.

Boppard lies on the upper Middle Rhine, often known as the Rhine Gorge. This characteristic narrow form of valley arose from downward erosion of the Rhine's riverbed. Since 2002, the Gorge has been a UNESCO World Heritage Site. A 17 km (11 mi) stretch of the Rhine forms the town’s eastern limit. Along this part of the river lie the outlying centres of Hirzenach and Bad Salzig, as well as the town’s main centre, also called Boppard.

Directly north of Boppard, the Rhine takes its greatest bend. This bow is called the Bopparder Hamm, although this name is more commonly applied to the winegrowing area found along it. The best known lookout point over this bow in the Rhine is the Vierseenblick, or "Four-Lake View". This vista gets its name from the way in which the Rhine can be seen from here, or rather the way in which it cannot be seen: hills block out most of the view of the river itself so that visitors can only see four apparently separate patches of water, rather like four lakes. These are all actually parts of the Rhine; there are no lakes to be seen. The Vierseenblick can be reached by chairlift.

Boppard's town forest is the second biggest in Rhineland-Palatinate with an area of 43.6 square kilometres (16.8 sq mi).

Since 1969, the town of Boppard has belonged to the Rhein-Hunsrück-Kreis, and is the district's northernmost municipality. Boppard is a middle centre; the nearest upper centre is Koblenz, some 22 kilometres (14 mi) away.

=== Constituent communities ===
Since 1976, Boppard has consisted of ten Ortsbezirke, a special kind of municipal internal division found in some cities and towns in Rhineland-Palatinate (and also Hesse). Each Ortsbezirk has its own council, whose head bears the title Ortsvorsteher. Some of these Ortsbezirke even have their own Ortsteile, but these have no separate representation on any council. Boppard's Ortsbezirke are as follows:

- Boppard (main centre) with the Ortsteil of Buchenau (and the Hellerwald commercial development)
- Bad Salzig
- Buchholz with the Ortsteil of Ohlenfeld
- Herschwiesen with the Ortsteil of Windhausen
- Hirzenach
- Holzfeld
- Oppenhausen with the Ortsteil of Hübingen
- Rheinbay
- Udenhausen
- Weiler with the Ortsteil of Fleckertshöhe

== History ==
The earliest trace of settlement unearthed by archaeologists in the Boppard area has been a storage yard dating back some 13,000 years to the time of the Federmesser culture.

=== Roman times ===
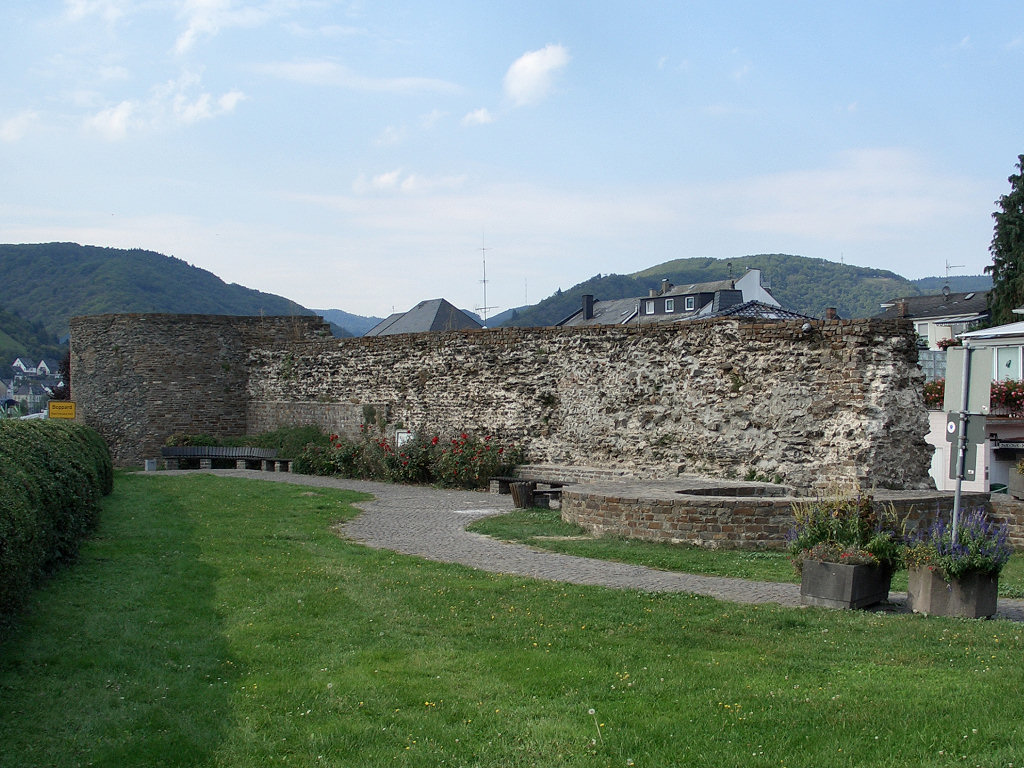
Late Roman castrum

In the course of Julius Caesar's conquest of Gaul and the ensuing Roman settlement of the lands on the Rhine's left bank, there also followed the founding of Vicus Baudobriga (also Bodobriga or Bontobrica) on the way into the Mühltal (valley). The name is of Celtic origin, which implies that there had been Celtic settlement before the Romans came, or perhaps that there was one at the same time as the Romans were there. With the expansion of the limes (frontiers or borders), the Middle Rhine lost its strategic importance.

On the other hand, the river was gaining more and more importance as a supply and trade avenue. In the mid-3rd century, the Rhine's right bank had to be evacuated and conceded to the Germani, thereby making the Rhine the Empire's border once more. In 355, Roman Emperor Julian stopped the Germanic invasion and began securing the Middle Rhine. His successor Valentinian I finished the work. It was also at this time that the Late Roman castrum, the Römerkastell Boppard on the Roman road through the Rhine valley, was built. Towards the end of 405, the last Roman troops were withdrawn to defend Italy. The town's next documentary mention did not come until the Early Middle Ages. According to this source from 643, Boppard was a Frankish royal estate and an administrative centre of the Bopparder Reich (a Merovingian state).

=== Holy Roman Empire ===
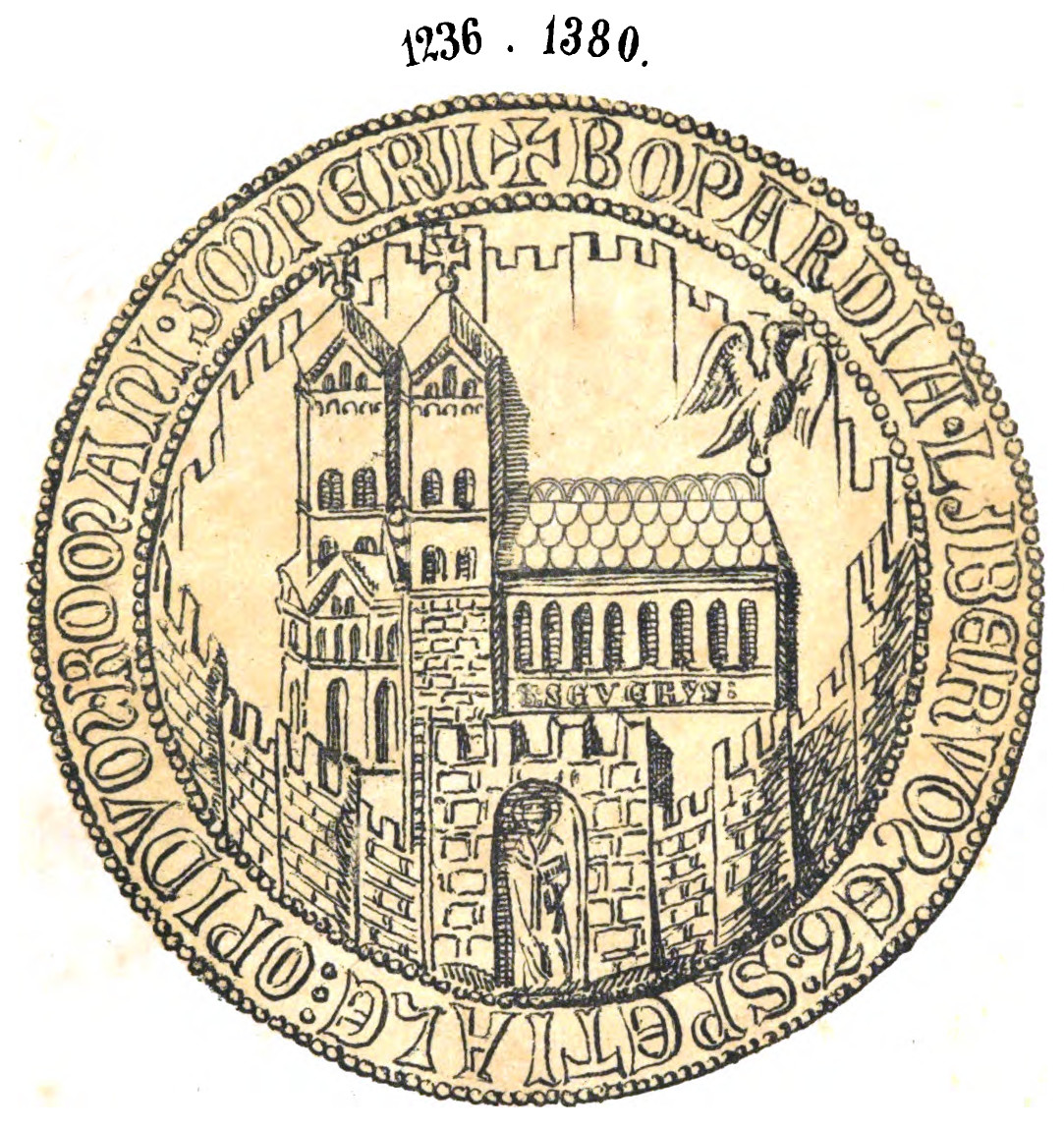
Image of the city seal in the British Museum (here Latinized as BOPARDIA)

Until 1309, Boppard was a free imperial city, and as such was often frequented by the German kings, who would then reside at the so-called Royal Estate. A bronze seal-die dating from 1228–36, now in the British Museum, proclaims the independence of Boppard under the reign of the Holy Roman Emperor. Its excellent state of preservation provides a tantalizing glimpse of the medieval town, complete with Romanesque cathedral and city walls. The Royal Estate lay at the end of the Mühltal on the Rhine. Governing the town and the surrounding Imperial Estate were Imperial ministeriales; the head official in town was the Schultheiß. A series of the ministeriales lived in the town, among whom were the Beyer von Boppard family, the family "among the Jews", the von Schönecks and the von Bickenbachs (named after the village of Bickenbach in the Hunsrück).

In 1309 and 1312, Emperor Heinrich VII pledged Boppard along with its outlying lands to his brother, Archbishop Baldwin of Trier. The Boppard townsfolk, however, felt that this merger with the Electorate of Trier was unlawful. They tried to struggle against what they saw as a foreign ruler and in 1327, they set up their own council. After a short siege, Baldwin had the town stormed and quelled this challenge to his authority, thus absorbing the town of Boppard into the Electorate of Trier. Baldwin then had the toll castle – the Alte Burg ("Old Castle") – expanded, which was also meant to ensure his lordship over the town.

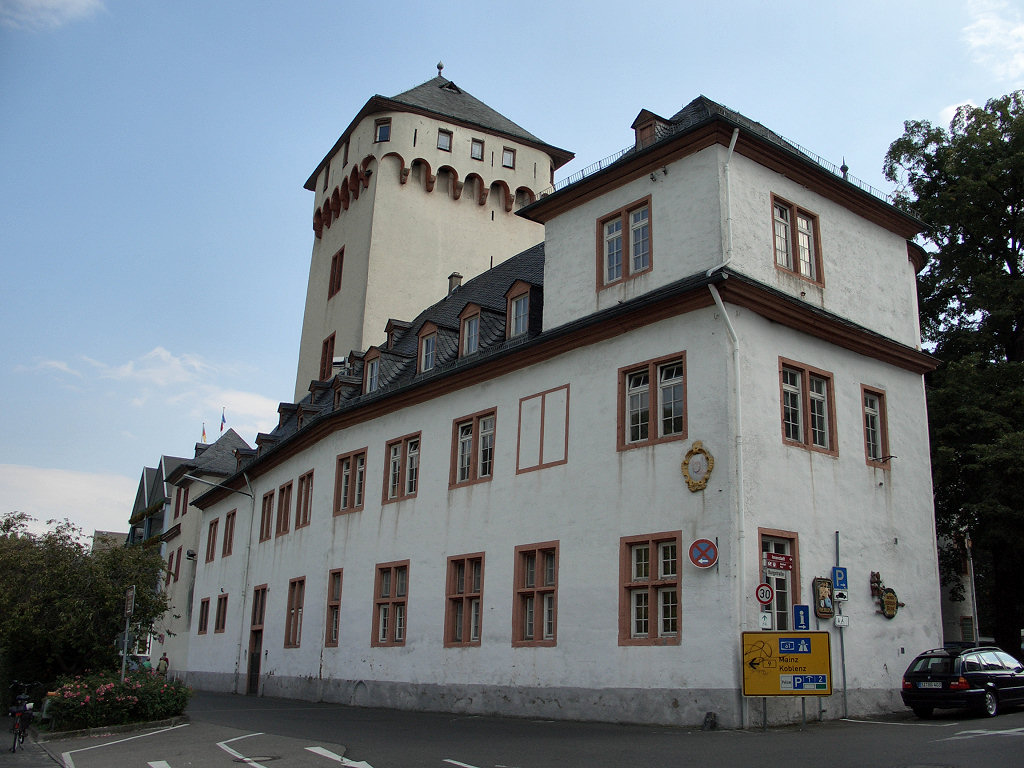
The Alte Burg ("Old Castle")

The Elector managed to win over the town nobility by taking them into his service and giving them jobs in administration, but the arrangement still did not sit well with the townsfolk. They had but one hope: to get rid of the pledge arrangement and reinstate the town's lost Imperial immediacy. Emperor Karl IV, though, dashed this hope. In 1368, he raised the sum of the pledge and promised that neither he nor his successor would allow the pledge to be redeemed. With high hopes, the townsfolk turned in 1496 to King of the Romans (and later Holy Roman Emperor) Maximilian I, who was supporting the town in its dispute with the Elector of Trier, Johann II of Baden. He freed Boppard from Electoral jurisdiction and tolls. However, Maximilian overstepped his authority in redeeming the pledge and had to revise his decision. This led in 1497 to the Boppard War. The Bopparders were not prepared to see their town once more annexed by the Electorate. So, the Elector of Trier advanced on the town with an army of 12,000 soldiers. The neighbouring places of Bad Salzig and Weiler surrendered without a fight. Boppard could not withstand the siege for long, and in the end had to acknowledge the Elector as their ruler.

In the Thirty Years' War, Boppard lost one third of its population. Swedish troops under Rhinegrave Otto Ludwig occupied the town on 18 January 1632. In the Nine Years' War (1688–1697; known in Germany as the Pfälzischer Erbfolgekrieg, or War of the Palatine Succession), an attack by French troops was successfully repulsed. In the War of the Polish Succession, French troops under General de Court attacked Boppard. The new Electoral City Policy of 1789 was meant to strengthen the Elector's influence, but by 1794, French Revolutionary troops had occupied the town, which remained under French rule for the next 20 years.

=== Prussian times ===
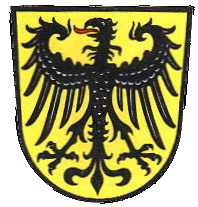
Former coat of arms of the town of Boppard from 1817. Here, the eagle's talons are not of a different tincture, and it is not surmounted by an inescutcheon as it is in the newer arms. Otherwise, the newer arms are based on the older ones.

Until Napoleon's downfall in 1813 and 1814, Boppard, along with all the lands on the Rhine's left bank, belonged to France. After Marshal Gebhard Leberecht von Blücher defeated the French troops, the victorious powers shared the administration of the territories under them. Thus, for a year and a half, Boppard was governed by the "Imperial and Royal" Austrian and Royal Bavarian joint Landesadministrationskommission.

In 1815 the Congress of Vienna assigned the town along with the Rhine's left bank as far upstream as Bingerbrück to the Kingdom of Prussia. In 1816, new districts (Kreise) were established and Boppard was assigned to the Sankt Goar district, which was dissolved in 1969. At the time of the Vormärz, political tensions arose in Boppard, too. These flared up in particular around the long-time mayor, Matthias Jacobs, who as the representative of the long established, Catholic middle and lower classes was always trying to prevail against the town's wealthy, liberal upper class. Only in the Year of Revolution (1848) did his opponents manage to drive him out of office.

The physician Dr. Heusner and the local businessman Jacob Mallmann opened the Mühlbad (baths) at Remigiusplatz (square) in 1841. Under Jacob's successor, Josef Syrée, who between 1848 and 1892 was Boppard's mayor, the town developed into a tourism centre and a spa. This new industry was furthered by the building of the Koblenz-Bingerbrück railway and the railway station in 1859. Steamship traffic on the Rhine, too, led to an upswing in the town's fortunes as a tourist centre. The Catholic middle and lower classes and the liberal, upper-class newcomers often found themselves at odds with each other, and this broke out into the open in 1872 with the Kulturkampf, which lasted several years. In particular, Mayor Syrée's and his liberal followers’ conversion to Old Catholicism brought yet another religious figure into the fray. As the representative of the Catholic middle and lower classes, the long-time dean Berger, who also enjoyed some fame as a poet, was the mayor's opponent.

During the 19th century, Boppard's population grew from some 3,000 at the beginning to some 5,000 by about 1875.

=== 20th century ===
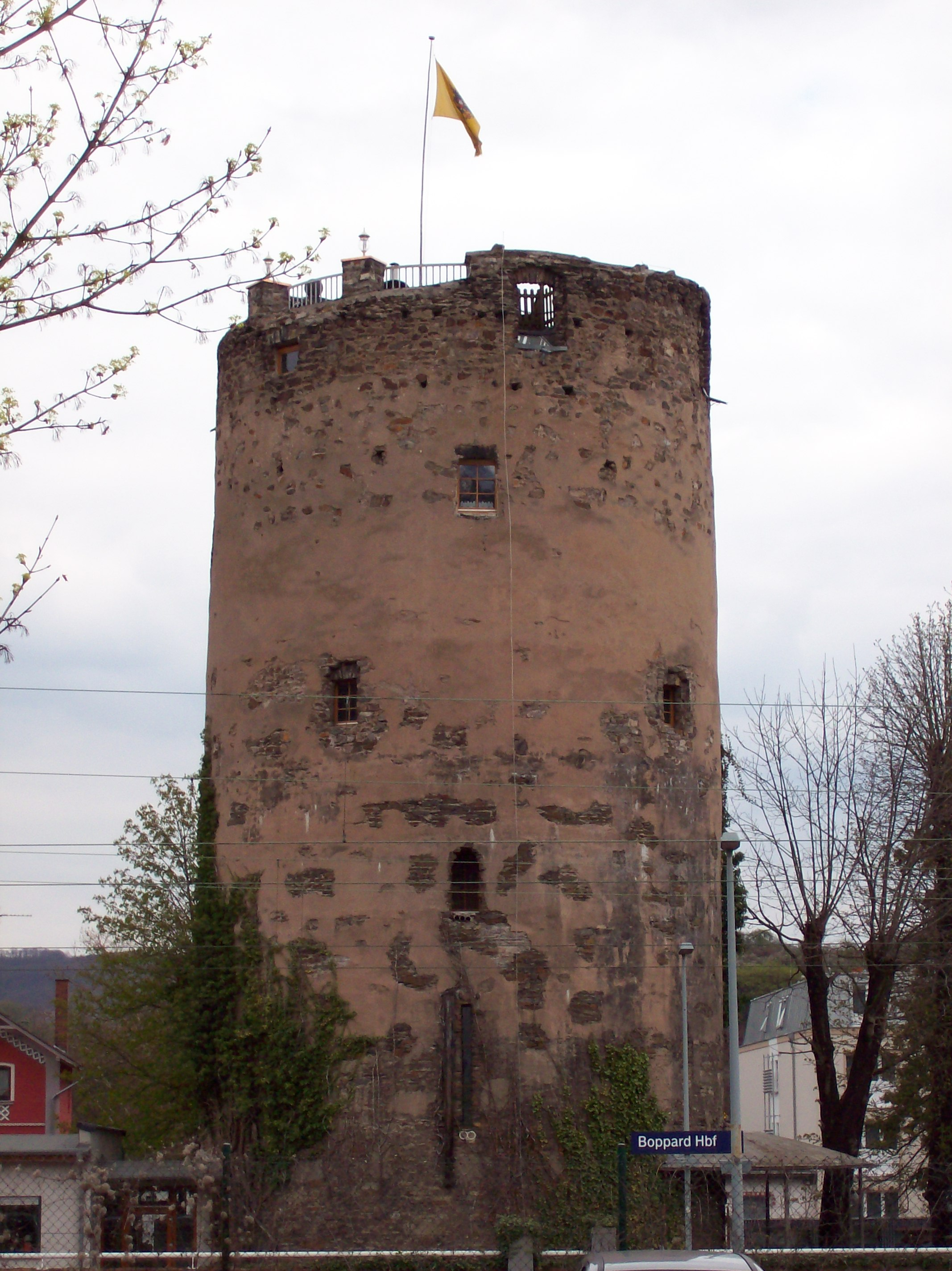
Säuerlingsturm

About 1903, work began on linking another railway line to the station, the Hunsrückbahn. Because the old Säuerlingsturm, a tower that had been part of the town's mediaeval fortifications, was standing in the way, it had to be dismantled in 1906–1908, and it was then reassembled – albeit with thinner walls – north of its old location. In 1908, the last section of this line was completed and in the same year, it was opened.

Even after the First World War, the Rhine Province, and thereby Boppard too, belonged to Prussia. Between 1919 and 1923, there were efforts throughout the Rhineland to separate from Prussia, but they were unsuccessful. The National Socialists’ election to power in 1933 brought Boppard no changes at first, as the Centre Party had won 50% of the vote at the 1933 elections. However, on Kristallnacht (9–10 November 1938), the Nazis destroyed the synagogue on Binger Gasse (lane), which had been opened in 1867. Many Jews were seized, and some were sent to concentration camps. Roughly two thirds of the 100 or so Jews living in Boppard emigrated. Those that remained were deported in 1942. In 1940, the Marienberg Convent and its associated school were closed under pressure from the régime. Although Boppard was not the main target of any air strike, bombs were nevertheless dropped on the town. Beginning on 19 March 1945, the Rhine's left bank was controlled by United States forces, who built an emergency bridge across the Rhine at Boppard.

Since 1946, the town has been part of the then newly founded state of Rhineland-Palatinate. In 1952, the outlying centre of Boppard-Buchenau was founded. In the course of administrative restructuring in Rhineland-Palatinate in the 1960s, the district of Sankt Goar was dissolved and Boppard was grouped into the new district of Rhein-Hunsrück-Kreis. Municipal boundaries, too, underwent reform. For Boppard, this meant that as of 28 July 1970, the town found itself, along with Bad Salzig, Buchholz, Herschwiesen, Hirzenach, Holzfeld, Oppenhausen, Rheinbay, Udenhausen and Weiler in a new Verbandsgemeinde. This, however, did not last. Later that same year, the idea was floated to merge Boppard with these nine other municipalities to form a unified, greater Boppard. This was meant to simplify administration, and besides, it would bring the town a DM 12,000,000 bonus from the state. With the promise that this money would be spent mainly on the outlying centres, eight of the ten still self-administering municipalities – including Boppard itself – came round to seeing the merger as the right way to proceed.

Bad Salzig, on the other hand, would only agree to amalgamation as long as the new, greater Boppard could be called Boppard-Bad Salzig. Oppenhausen, for its part, completely refused to even consider the idea. Nonetheless, since the municipalities that agreed to amalgamation were home to more than two thirds of the Verbandsgemeinde's population, and since the Verbandsgemeinde council itself also supported the proposal, the Minister of the Interior was able to effect the change by issuing a regulation. This was implemented on 31 December 1975. The newly founded municipality was given the name of Boppard. This led the now Ortsteil of Bad Salzig to appeal to the State Constitutional Court – on the same day – and file suit to have the Interior Ministry’s regulation overturned. The ruling came on 8 May 1977; the Court rejected Bad Salzig's bid.

Since the old town of Boppard was dissolved by the regulation, Boppard also no longer held town rights. Boppard’s legal quest was, however, more successful than Bad Salzig’s, and an appeal to the state government led to Boppard being granted town rights once more on 10 July 1976.

== Politics ==
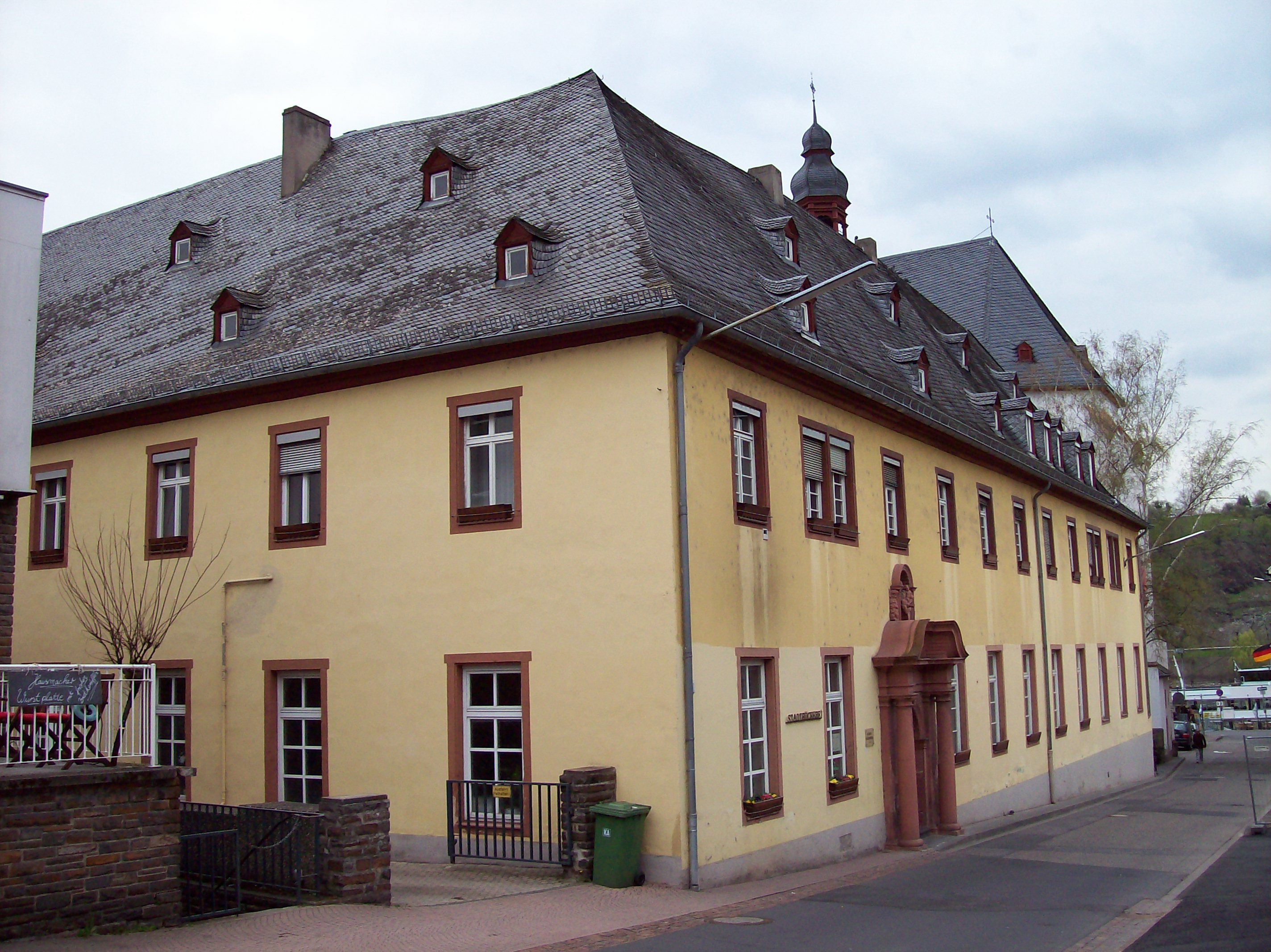
Former Carmelite monastery, now the Town Hall

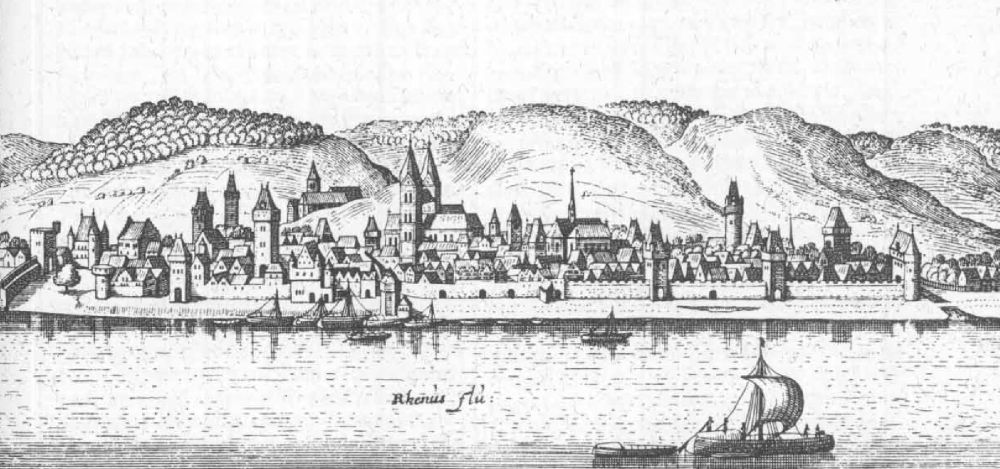
Boppard – Excerpt from Topographia Hassiae by Matthäus Merian, 1655

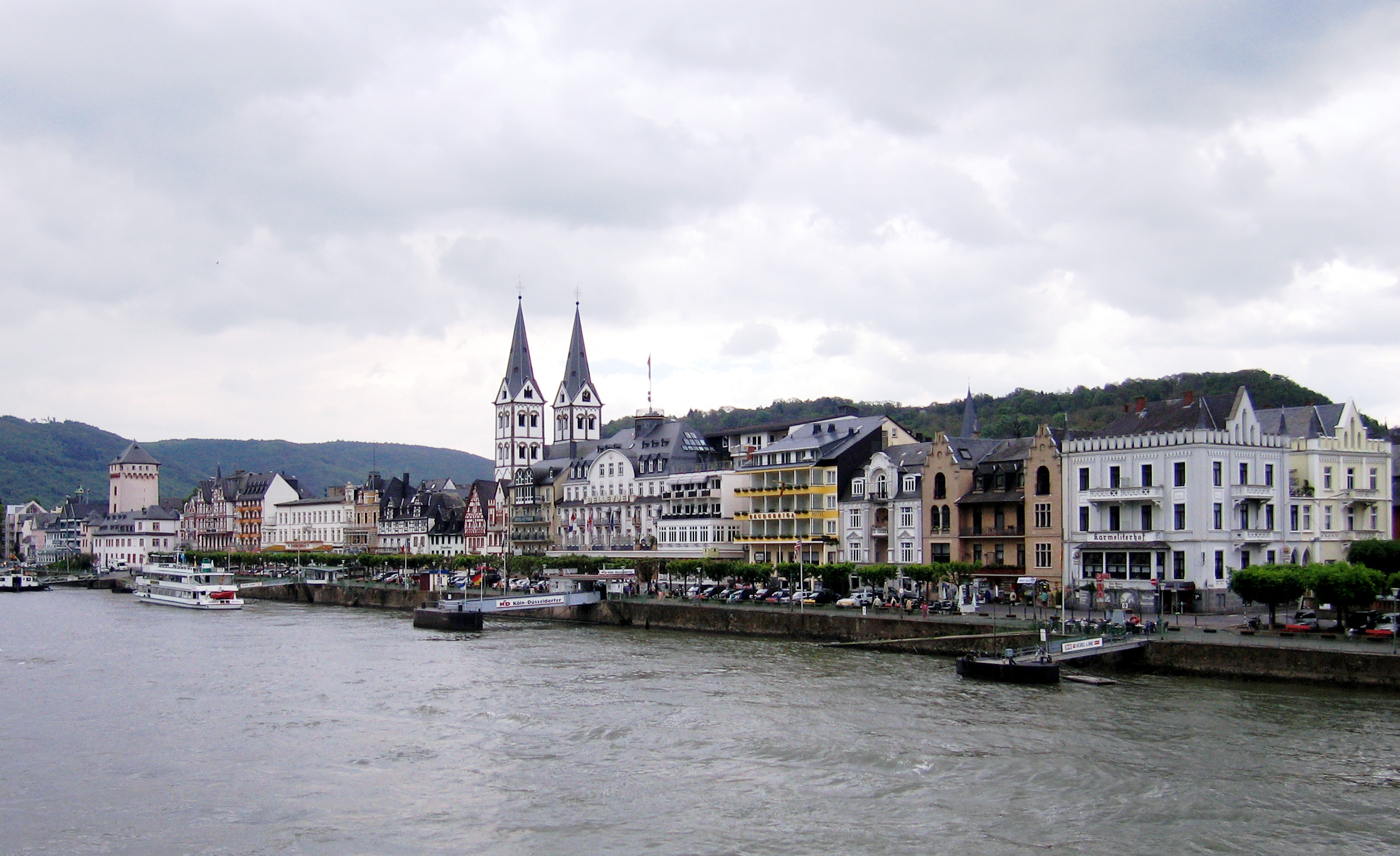
The Rhine Promenade of Boppard

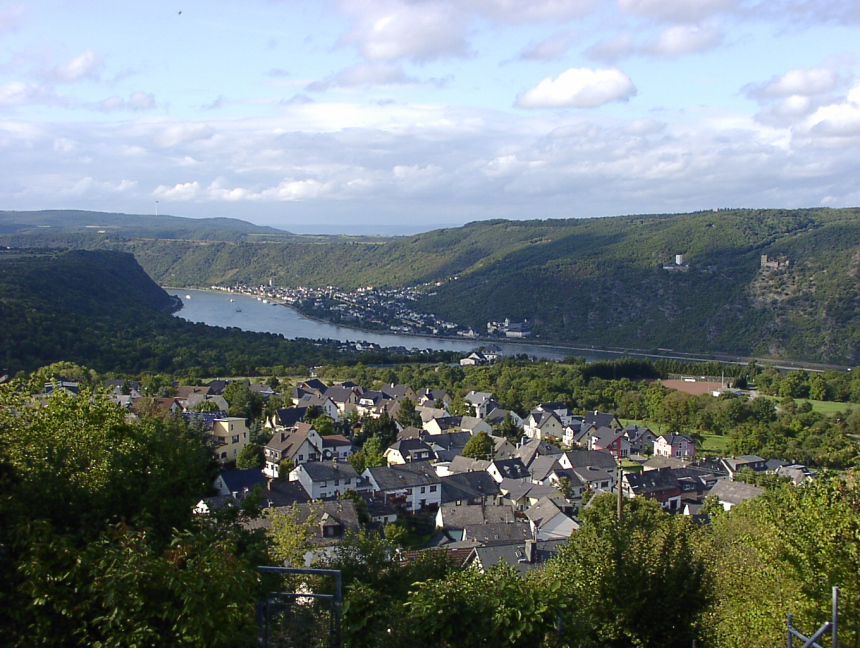
Weiler with view of the Rhine

Since 1976, the town administration has been housed at the former Carmelite monastery. The mayor’s office, too, is to be found here. The town council meetings, though, are still held at the old Town Hall, built to plans by Paul Rowald in 1884 and 1885 in the Renaissance Revival style, on the marketplace.

=== Town council ===
The council is made up of 32 part-time council members, who were elected at the municipal election held on 7 June 2009, and the full-time mayor as chairman.

The municipal election held on 7 June 2009 yielded the following results:

	CDU	SPD	Grüne	Bürger für Boppard	Frei Wählergruppe Boppard	FDP	Total
2009	12	11	3	3	2	1	32 seats

As a result of this division of political fortunes, a CDU-Green-FWG coalition was formed.

Elections in May 2014:

- CDU: 11
- SPD: 11
- Bürger für Boppard: 3
- Freie Wählergruppe Boppard: 3
- Greens: 2
- FDP: 1
- Liste "Bengart": 1

=== Mayor ===
The mayor is elected every eight years. Boppard's current mayor, elected in March 2021, is Jörg Haseneier (CDU). He succeeded Dr. Walter Bersch (born 1954), who had been in office since 1997.

=== Coat of arms ===
The German blazon reads: In Gold ein rot bezungter und rot bewehrter schwarzer Adler mit silbernen Krallen, belegt mit einem Herzschild, darin in Silber ein rotes Balkenkreuz.

The town's arms might in English heraldic language be described thus: Or an eagle displayed sable armed and langued gules and clawed argent, his breast surmounted by an inescutcheon of the last charged with a cross of the third.

Once the new, greater town of Boppard had been founded, the town's old arms lost their validity. Only in 1985 could the town council reach an agreement on new arms. The problem stemmed from, among other things, wanting to please everyone by choosing an heraldic emblem with which all Ortsbezirke could identify. This was not easy from an heraldic point of view, for only two of the constituent communities, Boppard and Bad Salzig, had borne arms before amalgamation. The other eight therefore had no heraldic history. Thus it was decided that the new coat of arms should be charged with the Imperial Eagle, like the old arms, but that the eagle should have an inescutcheon on its breast, itself charged with Saint George's Cross, ironically the heraldic device formerly borne by the Electorate of Trier, against whose hegemony the townsfolk had once fought so hard. The Imperial Eagle was meant to refer to the time when Boppard was a free imperial city – before the widely unpopular pledge put the town in Electoral-Trier hands – and the Trier cross, of course, to the time under Trier's rule. An element of unity could be seen in the latter charge, for all but one of the Ortsbezirke had once lain under Electoral-Trier sovereignty, Holzfeld being the only one that never had.

=== Town partnerships ===
Boppard fosters partnerships with the following places:

City	Region	Country	Year
Ōme	Tokyo	Japan	1965
Amboise	Indre-et-Loire (Centre-Val de Loire)	France	1985
Truro	Cornwall (South West England)	UK	1991
Keszthely	Zala	Hungary	1997
Nyabitekeri	(Rwanda) Western Province	Rwanda	2008

== Culture and sightseeing ==
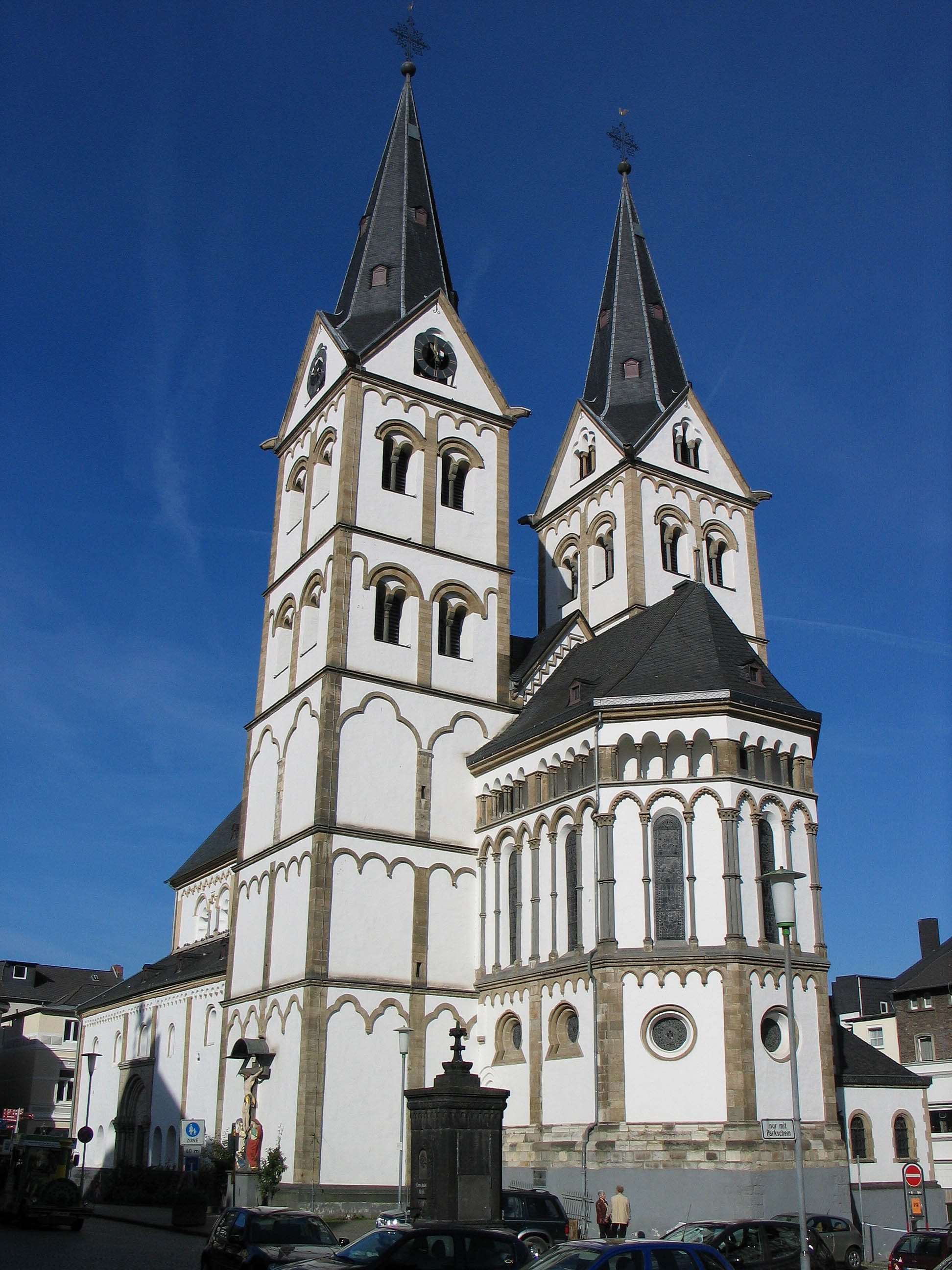
Saint Severus's Church

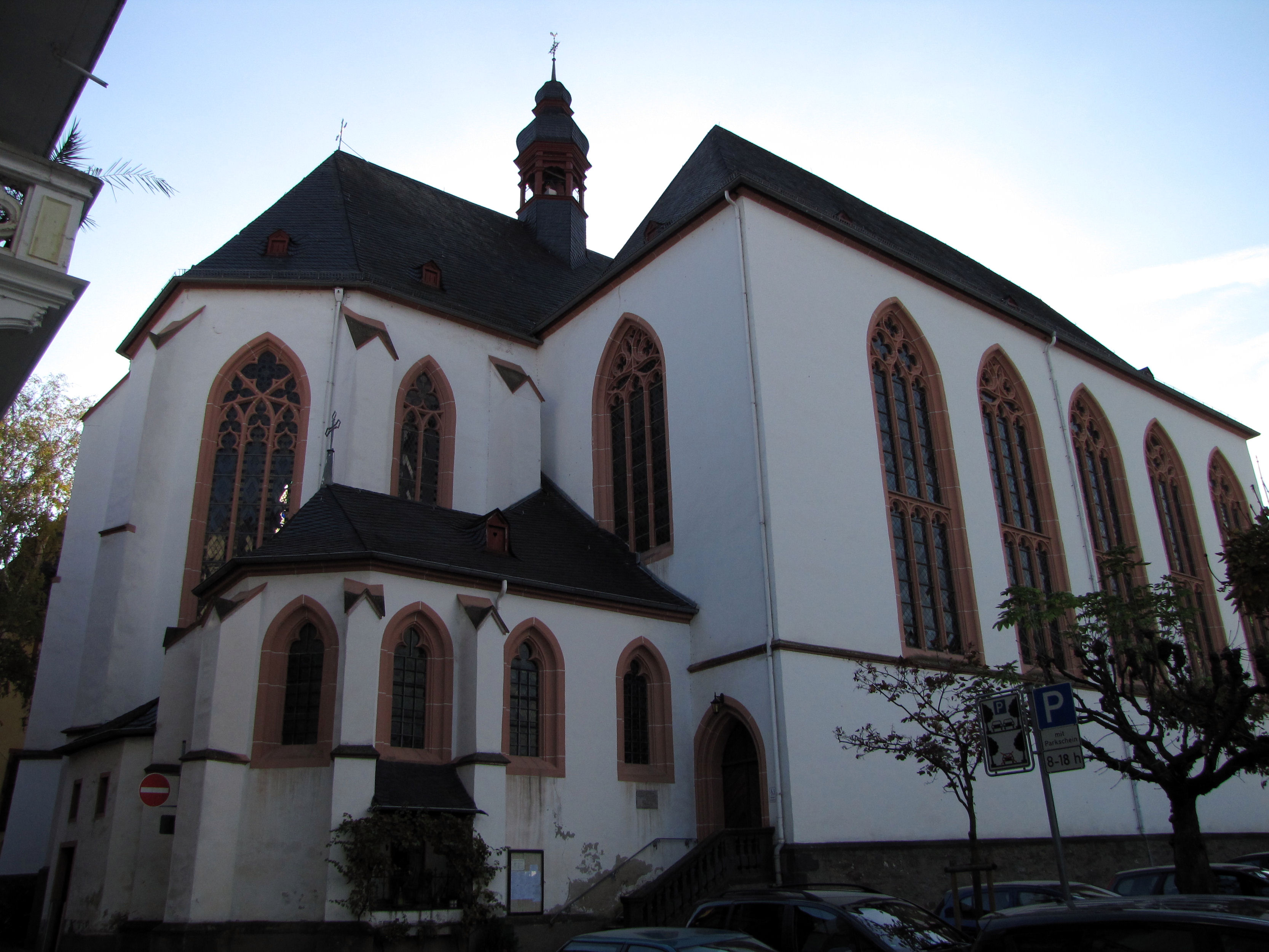
Carmelite Church

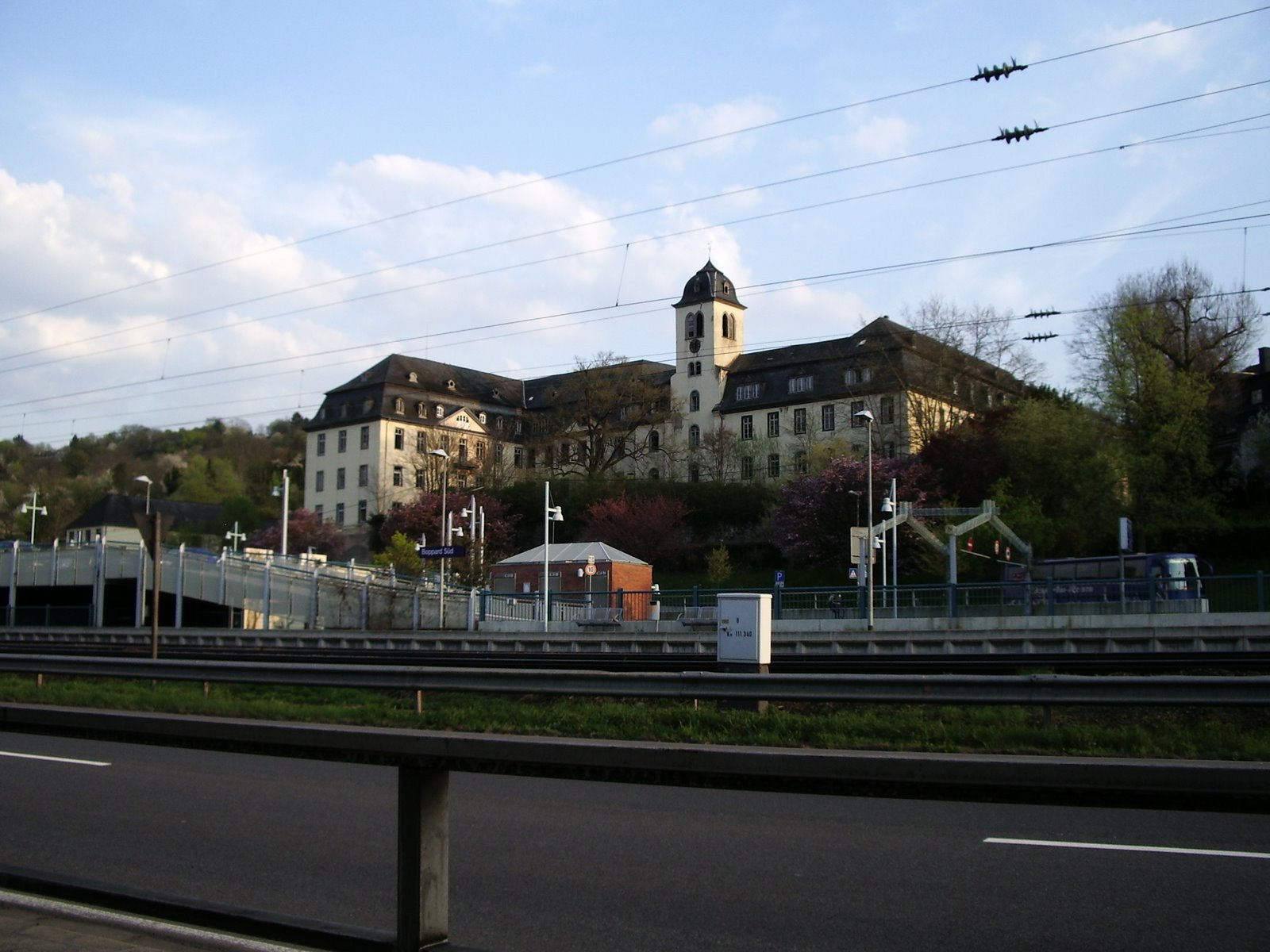
Marienberg Convent

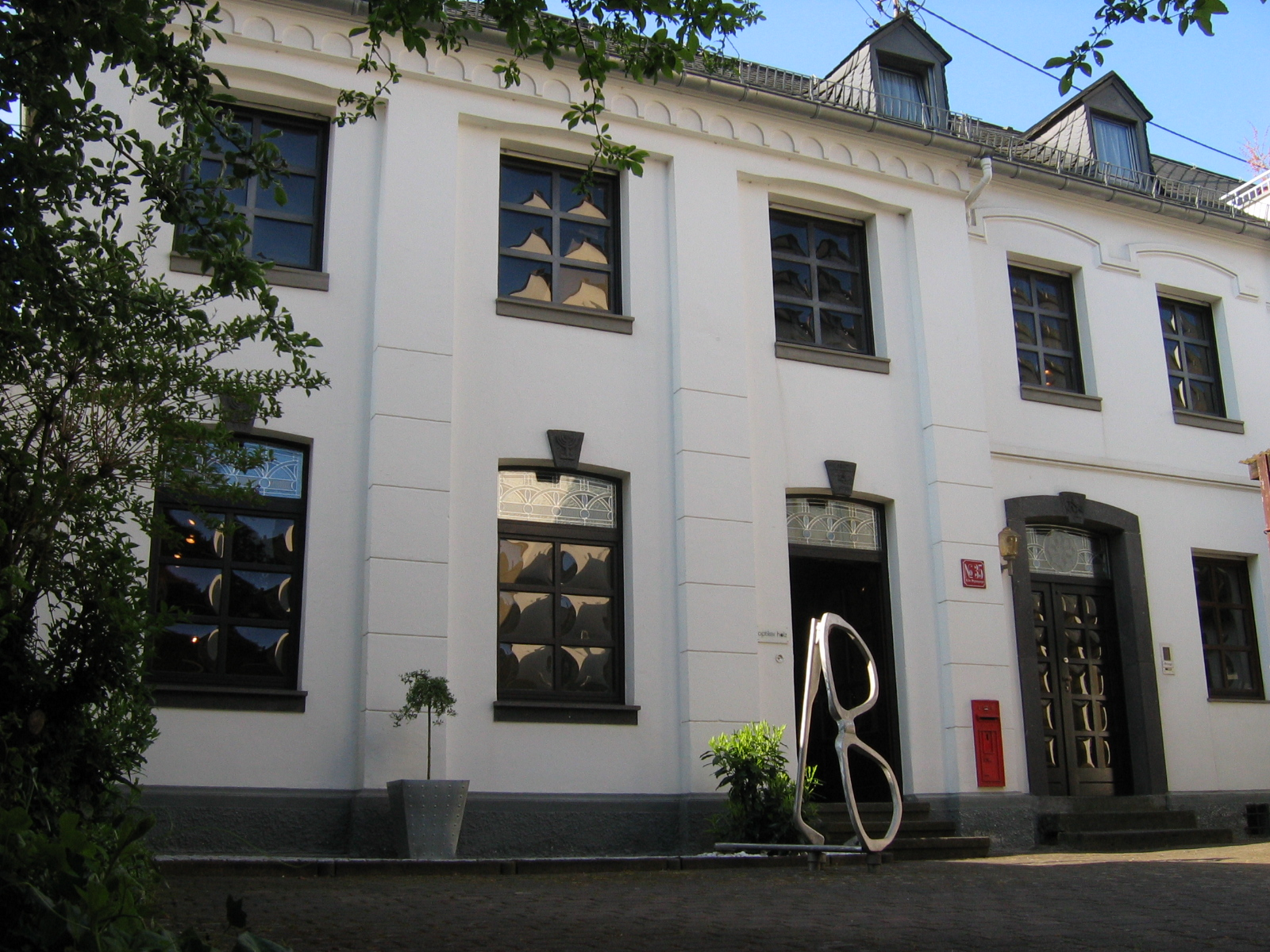
Former synagogue

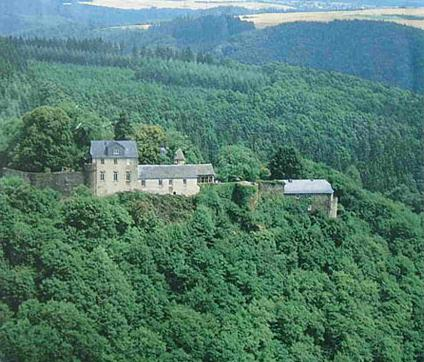
Schöneck Castle near Windhausen

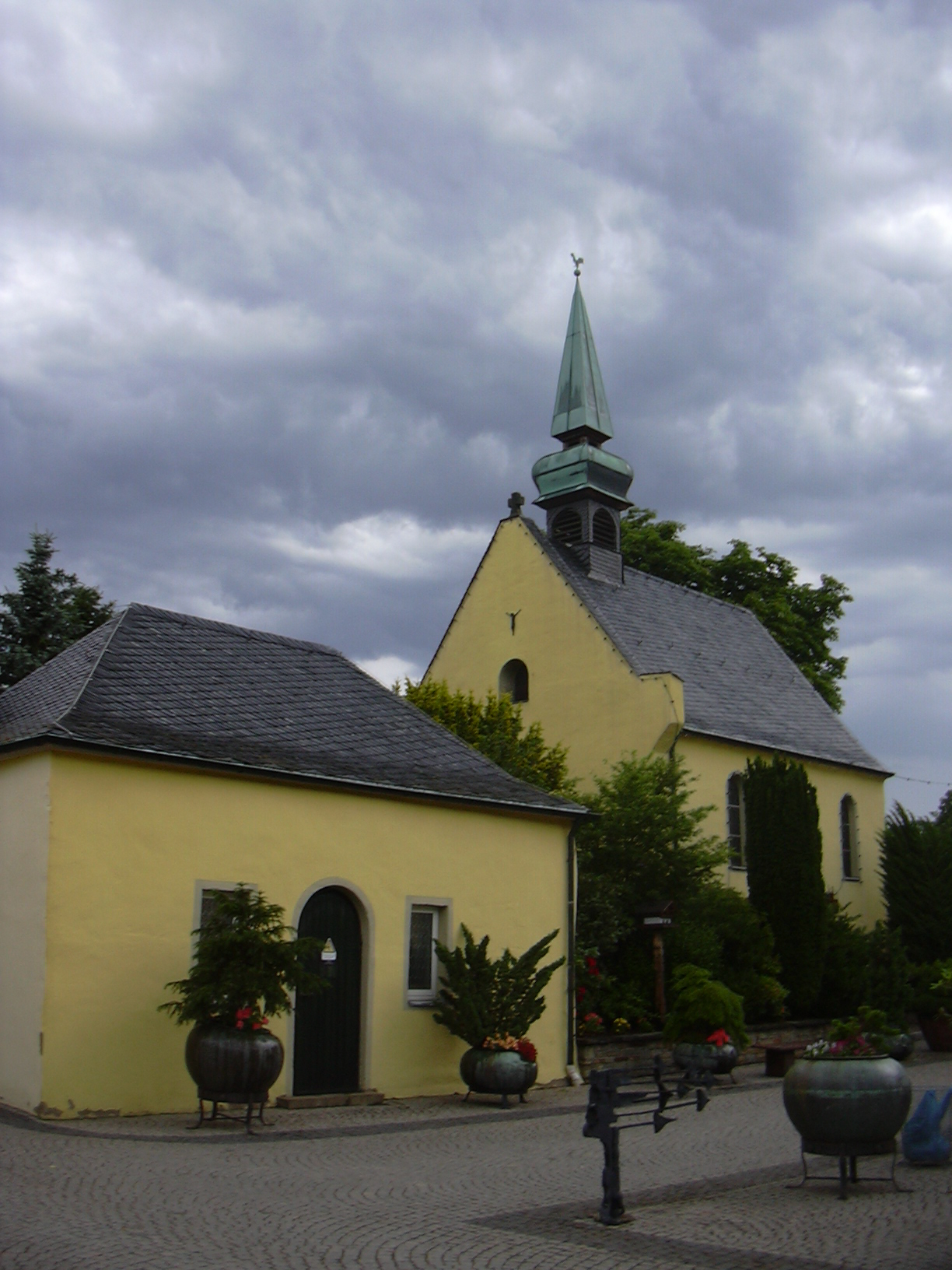
Boppard, east of the Jakobsbergerhof: Jakobskapelle (chapel)

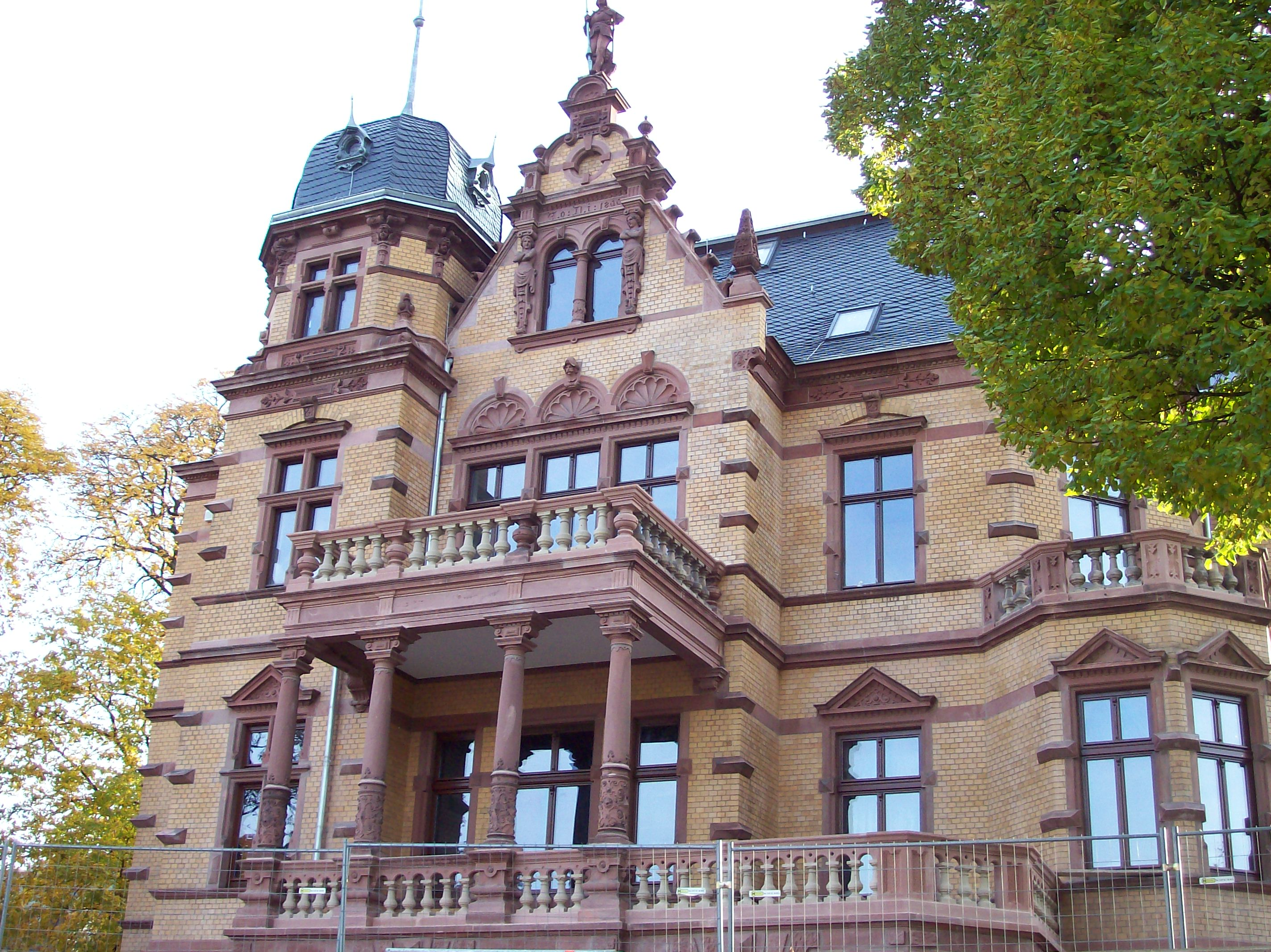
Boppard, Untere Fraubachstraße 2: Villa Belgrano

=== Buildings ===
The following are listed buildings or sites in Rhineland-Palatinate's Directory of Cultural Monuments:

==== Boppard landmarks ====
- Former Electoral castle (Alte Burg), Burgplatz 2 – four-winged complex with two round towers, north wing lengthened, keep, soon after 1312, altered in 1499 after fire and in the 17th century; on the east wing and on the former tollhouse coats of arms of Archbishops Karl Kaspar von der Leyen-Hohengeroldseck (1652–1672) and Johann VIII Hugo von Orsbeck (1672–1711)
- Angertstraße – Evangelical Christ Church (Christuskirche); cruciform Romanesque Revival aisleless church with columned vestibule, 1850–1852, building inspector Althoff, Koblenz; expansion and west tower 1885–1887
- Carmelite Catholic Church (Karmeliterkirche) and former Carmelite monastery, Karmeliterstraße – originally towerless aisleless church, under construction in 1320, aisle 1439–1444; monastery, plain Baroque complex, marked 1730; whole complex of buildings
- Saint Severus’s Catholic Parish Church (Pfarrkirche St. Severus), Kronengasse 3 – former canonical foundation church, Crucifixion group, three-naved gallery basilica, earlier half of the 13th century, quire flanking towers possibly from the first fourth of the 12th century; outside Crucifixion group of the former graveyard, marked 1516
- Town wall – remnants of the Roman castrum, possibly after 364 until 375, Roman tower; mediaeval town fortifications, first expansion of the Roman castrum about the Friesenviertel ("Frisian Quarter"), 12th century, after 1327 until the mid-14th century wall building about Oberstadt ("Upper Town") and Niederstadt ("Lower Town"); Sandtor ("Sand Gate") or Eisbrechertor ("Cutwater Gate"), gate tower with so-called Nikolauskanzel ("Saint Nicholas’s Pulpit") and tomb slabs; remnants of the Bingertor ("Bingen Gate"); south wall preserved in almost original height; Burgplatz 1 and 3 see below; Säuerlingsturm (roughly "Mineral Water Tower"), in 1906–1908 partly torn down and reconstructed; Ebertor ("Boar Gate"), hipped mansard roof, about 1750; tomb slab 1595, coat of arms stone, third fourth of the 17th century; corner of Rheinallee/Bahnhofstraße 2 (see below) 15 m long piece of wall; Hospitaltor ("Hospital Gate"), originally three-floor gate tower, remodelled in the mid 18th century with mansard roof; Kronentor ("Crown Gate"), gate tower, two twinned windows, 17th century; second upper floor timber-frame, 18th century; three-floor timber-frame house, partly solid, plastered, essentially from the 17th century, remodelled in the 18th century; Lilientor ("Lily Gate"), marked 1857 (reconstruction) with Late Historicist oriel construction, 1896
- Am Alten Posthof 2 – post office; stately Romanesque Revival plastered building, 1895; former Kleines Hospital ("Little Hospital") "Gotteshaus" ("House of God", a synonym in German for "church"), later Alte Posthalterei ("Old Coaching Inn"); hook-shaped timber-frame building, partly solid, hipped roof; essentially possibly from the 16th century, remodelled in the 17th and 18th centuries; whole complex of buildings
- Auf der Zeil 20 B – Haus Bethseda; plastered building, staircase, 1858/1859, expansion 1904
- At Bahnhofstraße 2 – town wall remnant on the side of the house on Rheinallee
- Binger Gasse 18 – Gothic Revival winery building, brick, about 1860
- Binger Gasse 21 – three-floor timber-frame house, partly solid, plastered, essentially from the 16th century
- At Binger Gasse 34 – two carved wooden brackets, marked 1607
- Buchholzer Straße 4 – Haus Sabelshöhe; villa, about 1900; whole complex of buildings with garden
- Burdengasse 1 – timber-frame house, partly solid, marked 1681
- Burdengasse 7 – building with half-hipped roof, timber framing plastered, 17th century
- Burgplatz 1 – three-floor plastered building, 19th century, part of the town wall
- Burgplatz 3 – Hotel "Römerburg"; two-floor solid building, about 1910; part of the town wall
- Burgstraße 2 – brick corner building, now plastered, about 1880, Ladenlokal, about 1928
- Eltzerhofstraße 2 – three-floor plastered building, partly timber framing, about 1900/10
- Eltzerhofstraße 21 – Hotel "Zum Römer"; timber-frame house, partly solid, plastered, latter half of the 17th century
- Eltzerhofstraße 25 – building with hipped mansard roof, marked 1925
- Flogtstraße 48 – brick villa, about 1900
- Hintergasse 3 – stately timber-frame house, marked 1551, 1553, gable and roof from the 19th century
- Humperdinckstraße 12 – plastered building, partly timber framing in 17th-century style, about 1890
- Humperdinckstraße 14 – plastered building with low-key gable risalti, about 1910
- Humperdinckstraße 25 – so-called Humperdinckschlösschen; Late Classicist villa, about 1870, from 1897 to 1900 composer Engelbert Humperdinck's main residence; whole complex of buildings with park
- Karmeliterstraße 1/3 – former Hotel "Karmeliterhof"; three-floor double house in Tudor Gothic style, after 1867
- At Koblenzer Straße 194 – stucco tondo with allegorical woman figure, mid-19th century
- Koblenzer Straße 205 – villa, partly timber framing (brick infill), round tower, Swiss chalet style, about 1900
- Koblenzer Straße 236 – brick villa with sandstone framing around brickwork, Renaissance Revival, about 1900
- Koblenzerstraße 248 – so-called Königsvilla ("King's Villa"); two-winged Gothic Revival brick building, about 1890; coachman's house, 1½-floor brick building, partly timber framing, half-hipped roof; hearth heating plate, 18th century; whole complex of buildings with garden
- Kreuzweg 1 – timber-frame building, mansard roof, marked 1737, slated west wing with tower, 19th century
- Kreuzweg 4 – Weiße Villa ("White Villa"), representative villa; Classicist building with tower, 1875; whole complex of buildings with garden
- Kreuzweg/Ecke Rheinallee – so-called Schunk'sches Kreuz (cross); Crucifixion group, marked 1739
- Kronengasse 8 – three-floor timber-frame house, partly solid, half-hipped roof, 16th century
- Mainzer Straße 8 – former Saint Martin's Franciscan Convent; aisleless church, 1766–1768, portal with Gothic Revival sculpture of Saint John; west wing of the former convent building, essentially from the 18th century, altered in the 19th and 20th centuries, north wing from the 19th century; so-called Hohes Kreuz ("High Cross"), marked 1620, renovated in 1947 after destruction; whole complex of buildings
- At Mainzer Straße 15 – plastered villa façade, about 1870
- Mainzer Straße 16/18 – stately double villa, mezzanine, about 1890; whole complex of buildings with garden
- Mainzer Straße 17 – villa, Tuscan style, about 1870; whole complex of buildings with garden
- Mainzer Straße 20 – brick villa, Renaissance Revival, about 1870; whole complex of buildings with garden
- Mainzer Straße 24 – Kantgymnasium (school); three-floor two-winged plastered building, Renaissance Revival, 1903–1906, expansion in 1945; two-floor headmaster's dwelling wing
- Mainzer Straße 29 – Gothic Revival brick villa, three-floor polygonal corner tower, 1863; whole complex of buildings with garden
- Mainzer Straße 40 – brick villa, hipped mansard roof, about 1902; whole complex of buildings with garden
- Mainzer Straße 41 – villa, about 1890; whole complex of buildings with garden
- Mainzer Straße 46 – Late Classicist villa, about 1875; whole complex of buildings with garden
- Mainzer Straße 54 – Late Classicist plastered villa, mezzanine, about 1870; whole complex of buildings with garden
- Marienberger Hohl 1 – former Marienberg Benedictine Convent; Baroque convent complex; four-winged complex with tower, abbess's building with columned portal, priory building, livestock building, 1739–1753, architect Thomas Neurohr, Tyrol; park complex
- Marienberger Straße 7 – Gothic Revival Villa, about 1905
- Marktplatz – basalt fountain, marked 1854
- Marktplatz 1 – three-floor, plastered timber-frame house, essentially from the 17th century
- Marktplatz 2 – plastered building with rounded corner, about 1860
- Marktplatz 3/4 – no. 3 four-floor timber-frame house, 16th century; no. 4 four-floor timber frame house, partly solid, essentially Late Gothic, extensively renovated in the 18th century
- Marktplatz 5 – "Ratsstube" Inn; timber-frame house, marked 1905
- Marktplatz 6 – three-floor timber-frame house, partly solid, plastered, essentially possibly from the 17th century
- Marktplatz 17 – former town hall; brick building, Renaissance Revival, 1884/1885
- Michael-Bach-Straße 1 – Late Classicist plastered building, corner bay window, about 1870
- Michael-Bach-Straße 2 – representative building with hipped roof, about 1870
- Mühltal – Heiligenhäuschen (a small, shrinelike structure consecrated to a saint or saints) with Baroque Madonna
- Mühltal 8 – Fondelsmühle (mill); timber-frame house, partly solid, towerlike risalto, hipped mansard roof, about 1760/1762; timber-frame house, hipped roof, 19th century; whole complex of buildings
- Niederstadtstraße 5 – Haus zum Heiligen Geist ("House to the Holy Ghost"); timber-frame house, partly solid, plastered, essentially possibly from the 16th century, conversion in the 18th century, marked 1732
- Niederstadtstraße 7 – three-floor timber-frame house, partly solid, marked 1655; two-floor side wing, partly timber-frame, 18th century
- Niederstadtstraße 8 – timber-frame house, half-hipped roof, 17th century; high-water marks, among others, 1683, 1784; in the garden town wall remnant
- Oberstraße 58 – stately brick building, after 1885
- Oberstraße 62 – cadastral office; Gothic Revival plastered building, 1903; adjoining wall with portal; whole complex of buildings with Franciscan church and teacher's college
- Oberstraße 86 – Hotel "Deutsches Haus"; three-floor plastered building, polygonal corner oriel tower, half-hipped roof, marked 1912
- Oberstraße 90 – rich three-floor timber-frame house with veranda, essentially possibly late mediaeval, radical conversion marked 1615

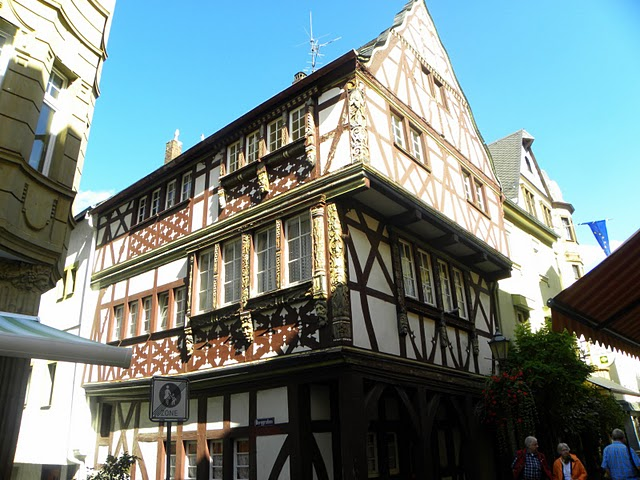
Oberstrasse 90

- Oberstraße 92 – residential and commercial house, Art Nouveau, 1906
- Oberstraße 115 – Wasserfasshof ("Water Barrel Manor"), so-called Arche; two-winged timber-frame house, partly solid, essentially from the mid 16th century, conversion and expansion marked 1623/1624, stable addition 19th century; gravestone
- Oberstraße 142 – former Eltzer Hof; building with half-hipped roof, timber framing, partly solid, plastered, Late Gothic profile, marked 1566; Baroque building with hipped mansard roof, about 1738, with old building linked to the town wall by a walkway; whole complex of buildings, partly on Roman town wall
- Oberstraße 147 – timber-frame house, partly solid, hipped mansard roof, 18th century
- Pastorsgasse 9 – former Evangelical parish office; ten-axis Early Classicist plastered building, dormer with Palladian elements, late 18th century
- Pützgasse 1 – timber-frame house, partly solid, plastered, 18th century
- Rheinallee – accident cross, 18th century
- Rheinallee 19 – Baroque Revival villa with mansard roof, staircase, about 1910/1920; whole complex of buildings with fence and big park
- Rheinallee 22 – Saint Michael's episcopal college; seven-axis plastered building with three-floor decorative façade, Renaissance Revival, 1902–1904
- Rheinallee 23 – Ritter-Schwalbach-Haus; Late Gothic castle house; three-floor building with hipped roof, staircase, essentially possibly from the 13th century
- Rheinallee 24 – former monastery church and teacher's college; long towerless aisleless church, 1683–1686, Gothic Revival Baroque; teacher's college, irregular three-and-a-half-floor four-winged complex, 1864–1868; whole complex of buildings with cadastral office
- Rheinallee 26, Seminarstraße (no number) – Rheinallee 26: former Knoodt’sches Haus; seven-axis plastered building, marked 1778, architect possibly Nikolaus Lauxen, Koblenz, expansion 1896; Seminarstraße (no number): so-called Templerhaus; Late Hohenstaufen plastered building, second fourth of the 13th century, integrated into the Ursuline school as a chapel in 1896 and expanded in Romanesque Revival style, conversion 1956, three-floor towerlike plastered building with three Late Romanesque double-arcade windows
- Rheinallee 32 – Hotel "Zum Hirsch"; four-floor timber-frame house, partly plastered, wooden loggia, about 1900 (partly dismantled in 2009)

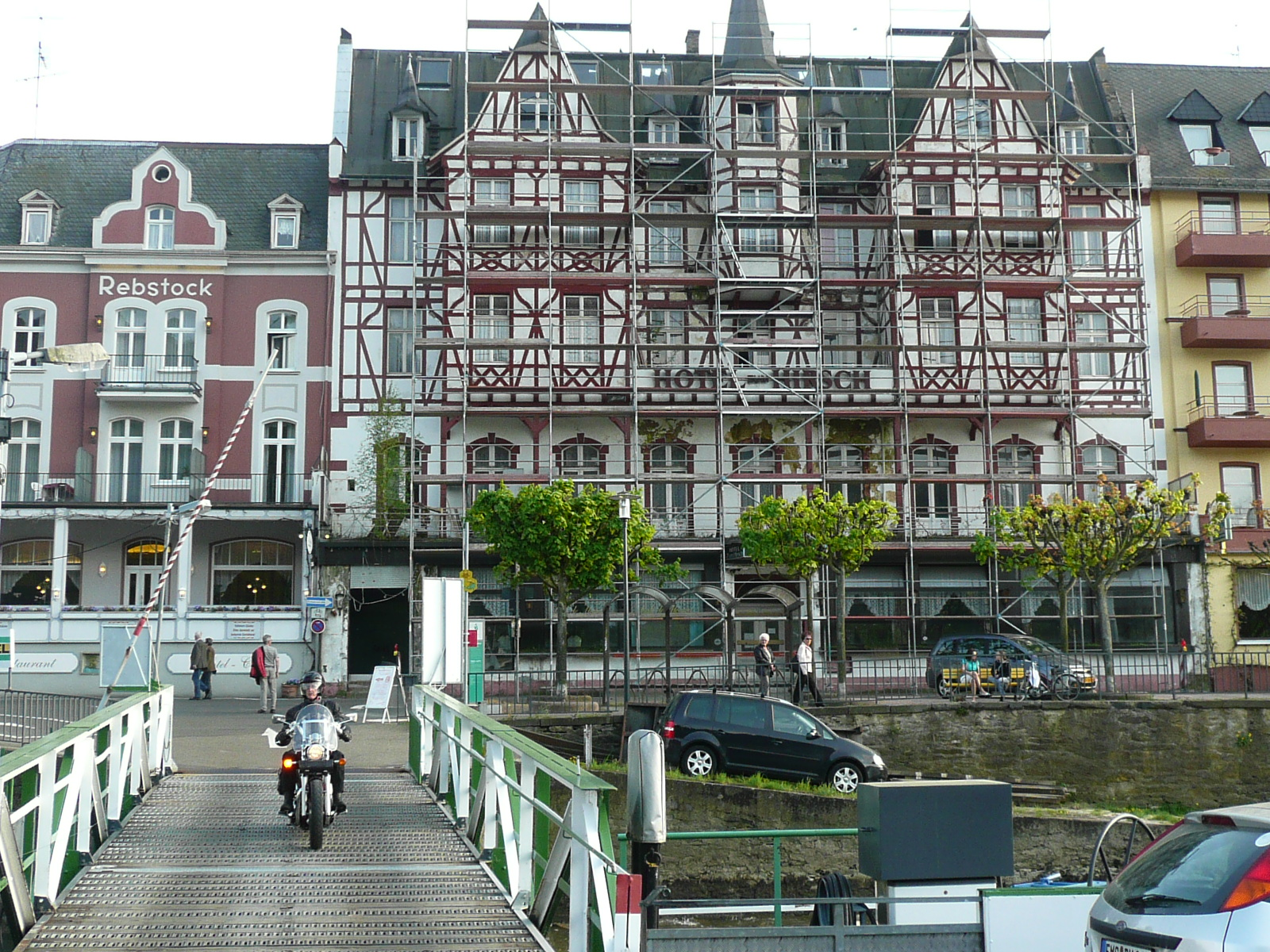
Zum Hirsch before deconstruction

- Rheinallee 44 – Catholic rectory; three-floor plastered building, Rococo Revival, 1901
- Rheinallee 47 – former orphanage; originally two-floor plastered building, 1863–1865, expanded in 1886/1887, raised in 1901/1902
- Rheinallee 51 – Hotel "Rheinvilla"; representative building with hipped roof, Classicist gabled portal, about 1865/1870; whole complex of buildings with garden
- Rheinallee 52 – 2½-floor villa, about 1865/1870; whole complex of buildings with garden
- Rheinallee 53 – 2½-floor villa, about 1865/1870; whole complex of buildings with garden
- Rheinallee, near the Ebertor – monument; gabled stele with relief, artificial stone, marked 1915
- Ritter-Schwalbach-Straße 1 – plastered building, partly decorative timber framing, about 1900
- Sabelstraße 25 – partly timber framing, stained glass windows, rich Art Nouveau décor, about 1910/1920
- Sabelstraße 26 – plastered building, partly timber framing, rich Art Nouveau décor, about 1900/1910
- Sabelstraße 27 – Berufsfachschule St. Carolus (professional school); originally a villa with park and gatehouse, 1910; castlelike plastered building, staircase, gatehouse, partly timber framing; whole complex of buildings with garden and gatehouse
- Sabelstraße 28 – plastered building, rich Art Nouveau décor, about 1910
- Simmerner Straße 12 – brick villa, about 1865
- Simmerner Straße 19 – villa, about 1890
- Steinstraße 31 – timber-frame house, latter half of the 17th century, expansion in the 18th century
- Untere Fraubachstraße 1 – villa with residential tower, about 1865/70
- Untere Fraubachstraße 2 – Villa Belgrano; representative brick building, Renaissance Revival, 1890; whole complex of buildings with garden
- Untere Marktstraße 5 – three-floor timber-frame house, 17th century
- Untere Marktstraße 7 – four-floor timber-frame house, essentially from the 16th century, alteration marked 1767
- Untere Marktstraße 8 – three-floor timber-frame house, plastered, essentially from the 17th century
- Untere Marktstraße 9 – three-floor timber-frame house, partly solid, plastered, 17th century
- Untere Marktstraße 10 – timber-frame house, latter half of the 16th century
- Untere Marktstraße 24 – four-floor timber-frame house, 16th century, mansard roof from the last third of the 18th century
- Zelkesgasse 12 – "Heilig Grab" winehouse; plastered building, about 1800
- Hunsrück-Bahn (monumental zone) – section of the railway line built in 1906–1908, one of the Prussian State Railway's steepest lines; two viaducts: Rauschenlochviadukt (at rail kilometre 49.4) and Hubertusviadukt (150 m long; at rail kilometre 49.6) and five tunnels: Hinterburden-Tunnel 1 (at rail kilometre 48), Hinterburden-Tunnel 2 (at rail kilometre 48.3), Rauerberg-Tunnel (at rail kilometre 49.9), Talberg-Tunnel (at rail kilometre 50.2) and Kalmut-Tunnel (at rail kilometre 51.1)
- Kreuzbergkapelle (chapel) with Way of the Cross, south of the town – Stations of the Cross 1851/1852; chapel, 1709–1724; wayside cross, marked 1760; forest house, timber-frame building, partly solid, marked 1769, expansion in the 19th and 20th centuries; whole complex of buildings
- Milestone on Bundesstraße 9 going towards Rhens – obelisk, about 1820
- Milestone on Bundesstraße 9 going towards Sankt Goar – obelisk, about 1820
- Votive cross on Proffenstiege – basalt, marked 1735
- Wayside cross, Kreuzer Flur (cadastral area) – so-called Stang’sches Kreuz (cross), marked 1760
- Wayside cross on Landesstraße (State Road) 210 going towards Buchenau – basalt, marked 1724
- At Jakobsbergerhof 1 – basalt portal, marked 16.., of the former monastery building
- East of the Jakobsbergerhof – Jakobskapelle (chapel); aisleless church, essentially post-mediaeval, conversion in the 18th and 19th centuries; cast-iron wayside cross, late 19th century; bough cross, early 20th century; 15 border stones

==== Bad Salzig ====
- Saint Giles's Catholic Church (Kirche St. Aegidius), Weilerer Weg – Gothic Revival pseudobasilica, 1899–1902, architect Lambert von Fisenne, Gelsenkirchen; Late Gothic west tower and quire, 15th century; outside: Crucifix, second fourth of the 15th century; Mount of Olives, about 1480; graveyard: 22 grave crosses, 16th to 18th century; border stone, eagle coat of arms, marked 1607; whole complex of buildings with graveyard and rectory
- Am Bahnhof (no number) – railway station; chevron-shaped slate quarrystone building group, "hometown" style, 1937
- Bopparder Straße – Crucifixion group, 19th century
- Dammigstraße 16 – timber-frame house, partly solid, earlier half of the 19th century
- Rheinbabenallee 1 – Hotel "Anker im Burgfrieden"; plastered building with flat-roofed porch, about 1925; Crucifix, 18th century
- At Rheinbabenallee 15 – coat of arms, marked 1743
- Rheinblick 4 – villa, hipped mansard roof, 1920s/1930s
- Rheinuferstraße 2/2a – timber-frame house, partly solid, mansard roof, staircase, marked 1647
- At Salzbornstraße 14 – bathhouse; three-part building complex, Baroque Revival plastered building, 1907
- St.-Ägidius-Straße 6 – Catholic rectory; plastered building, partly timber-frame, Swiss chalet style, 1905
- Sterrenberger Straße – wooden wayside cross, marked 1738 and 1813, bronze Body of Christ renovated in 1930

==== Buchenau ====
- Graveyard – graveyard building, 1875; cast-iron graveyard cross, latter half of the 19th century; cross, 1724; J. B. Berger tomb, about 1888, Gothic Revival, C. Berger tomb, about 1888
- Bridge on Landesstraße 210 – 1824, renovated
- Jewish graveyard on Landesstraße 210 (monumental zone) – opened in early 17th century (?), 130 gravestones, mainly from the late 19th century and the first third of the 20th century, oldest from 1605

==== Buchholz ====
- Auf den Gärten 17 – Quereinhaus (a combination residential and commercial house divided for these two purposes down the middle, perpendicularly to the street), timber framing plastered, earlier half of the 19th century
- Heidestraße 27 – former school; slate quarrystone building, about 1840
- Heidestraße 29 – former Saint Sebastian's Catholic Church (Kirche St. Sebastian); Romanesque Revival brick aisleless church, 1892–1896

==== Herschwiesen ====
- Saint Pancras' Catholic Parish Church (Pfarrkirche St. Pankratius), Pankratiusring – aisleless church, 1744–1746, master builder Johann Neurohr, Tyrol, two sculptures, about 1750, sculptor Joseph Kindtgen, Ehrenbreitstein
- Im Schiessgraben 1 – timber-frame house, half-hipped roof, oven addition, 18th century
- Pankratiusring 6 – former rectory; timber-frame house, partly solid, essentially possibly from the early 17th century, conversion marked 1715, expansion 1930; timber-frame barn, 18th century
- Pankratiusring 21 – timber-frame house, marked 1700
- Wayside cross, on Kreisstraße (District Road) 119 going towards Buchholz – marked 1798
- Wayside cross, on Kreisstraße 119 going towards Windhausen – marked 1748
- Wayside cross, on Kreisstraße 119 going towards Windhausen – marked 1819

===== Windhausen =====
- Schönecker Straße – Wallfahrtskapelle Zur Schwarzen Muttergottes ("Pilgrimage Chapel to the Black Madonna"); aisleless church, about 1770/1780
- Schönecker Straße 9 – timber-frame house, half-hipped roof, first third of the 18th century
- Schloss Schöneck, south of the village, on the Kreisstraße 120 extension – mentioned in 1222, Imperial ministerialis Philipp von Schöneck's fief, after the Eltz Feud (1331–1336) partly held by the Electorate of Trier, after 1354 wholly held by the Electorate of Trier, destroyed in 1618; terrace-shaped complex on a mountain ridge: only preserved parts are the girding wall with round open-backed towers and the outer bailey as well as two gateway arches on the way in; in the outer bailey former forester's dwelling from 1805; main castle expanded in 1846 and the early 20th century

==== Hirzenach ====
- Saint Bartholomew's Catholic Church (Kirche St. Bartholomäus), Kirchstraße – former Benedictine provostry church, Romanesque columned basilica, possibly begun soon after 1110, nave, crossing, bay before the quire, apse and tower's lower floor from the first fourth of the 12th century; west façade and tower's upper floors from the early 13th century (about 1220/1230); Early Gothic quire; main portal and paradise about 1250; churchyard with grave crosses; whole complex of buildings with provostry
- Kirchstraße 6 – so-called Villa Brosius, former Saint Bartholomew's Parish Church; aisleless church, expansion in the 19th century
- Propsteistraße – former provostry garden; rectangle with paths laid out at right angles and with Box hedges, in the centre a small fountain; earlier half of the 18th century
- Propsteistraße 2 – former Benedictine provostry; stately Baroque building with hipped mansard roof, marked 1716; remnant of a fountain complex, marked 1569; whole complex of buildings with church and garden
- At Propsteistraße 3 – coat of arms
- At Propsteistraße 4 – coat of arms, marked 1664

==== Holzfeld ====
- Evangelical church, Röhrenbornstraße 1 – aisleless church, 1769, mediaeval tower; whole complex of buildings with graveyard
- Jewish graveyard "Untern Budbach", Kellerchen district, in the forest (monumental zone) – opened in the mid 19th century, 15 gravestones from 1847 to 1924

==== Oppenhausen ====
- Wayside chapel, on the road to Herschwiesen, corner of Kreisstraße 120/Kreisstraße 119 – slate quarrystone aisleless church, marked 1850

==== Rheinbay ====
- Saint Sebastian's Catholic Church (branch church; Kirche St. Sebastian), Hauptstraße/corner of St.-Sebastian-Straße – slate quarrystone aisleless church, 1897–1899
- Villa Ludwigsruh, southwest of the village – Late Historicist villa, about 1900

==== Weiler ====
- Saint Peter in Chains Catholic Church (Kirche St. Peter in Ketten), Zur Peterskirche – quire, second fourth of the 13th century, aisleless church, latter half of the 13th century, roof frame from time of building; ridge turret 18th century; whole complex of buildings with graveyard

===== Fleckertshöhe =====
- Rheingoldstraße – Saint Anne's Catholic Chapel (Kapelle St. Anna); Gothic Revival plastered building, 1888

=== Further information on local buildings and sites ===
Over on the other side of the Rhine stand two castles, Burg Liebenstein and Burg Sterrenberg, known as the Feindliche Brüder ("Adversarial Brothers") after a German legend that arose in the 16th century, and the pilgrimage centre of Kamp-Bornhofen with its mediaeval monastery.

What follows expands somewhat on the entries in the Directory of Cultural Monuments:

- Roman castrum wall – Near the marketplace is the Römerpark with ruins of the Roman castrum fortifications from the 4th century AD. In the course of renovation work in Boppard's main townsite in 2009, parts of the western Roman wall were unearthed. Renovation work is still incomplete (as at December 2009)
- Mediaeval town wall – The Roman castrum walls were still used on into the Middle Ages. In the 14th century, the town was expanded in the west (Niederstadt or "Lower Town") and east (Oberstadt and "Upper Town") and girded the new parts of town with walls with towers. The Säuerlingsturm was part of the western fortifications. Major parts of the walls were first removed when the railway was built. Even so, many parts of the mediaeval town wall still stand today.
- Saint Severus's Church – At the marketplace stands the Late Romanesque Saint Severus's Church (1236), built on the foundations of a Roman military bath. During excavations under the church, remnants of a 6th-century early Christian church were found, with a keyhole-shaped pulpit facility (ambo) and a baptismal font. Comparable baths can be found in Cologne, England, Spain, Italy and the south of France.
- Electoral castle (Alte Burg, or "Old Castle") – Standing on the Rhine is the castle built by Baldwin of Trier. Today it houses Boppard's municipal museum.
- Carmelite Church – The church itself dates from the 14th and 15th centuries and was formerly the monastery church at the now long vanished Carmelite monastery, founded in 1265. The décor is opulent with monumental tombs, choir stalls and memorial plaques.
- Marienberg Convent – The convent was founded as early as 1120. After a fire, it was built again from the ground up (1738). At this time, it finds itself in a very poor state.
- Former synagogue – This was built in 1867 and was destroyed by Nazi vandals on Kristallnacht (9–10 November 1938).
- Noble estates – In the Middle Ages, many noble families lived in town. Some of their houses have remained preserved: Ritter-Schwalbach-Haus (15th century), Eltzer Hof (1566 and 1738), Templerhaus (essentially from the 13th century) and remnants of the Boos von Waldeck estate.
- Burg Schöneck – The castle stands on the Ehrbachklamm, part of a local river otherwise called simply the Ehrbach. This is near the outlying centre of Windhausen. It was built in 1200 under Imperial ministerialis Konrad von Boppard.
- On the Fleckertshöhe (heights) stands the Sender Boppard-Fleckertshöhe, an FM and microwave radio transmitter. The main antenna-bearing tower in this complex is of a unique construction. It was built as a 121 m-tall hybrid tower with a steel-framework support structure.
- Hunsrückbahn – This railway line from Boppard to Emmelshausen is among Germany's steepest. Among German railway lines still in operation, only the Rübelandbahn (Saxony-Anhalt) and the Rennsteigbahn (Thuringia) are steeper. The Hunsrückbahn is said to be one of Rhineland-Palatinate's most scenic railway lines. The train runs on this line across two viaducts and on the stretch between Boppard and Buchholz through five tunnels. It has stood under monumental protection since 1987.

=== Natural monuments ===
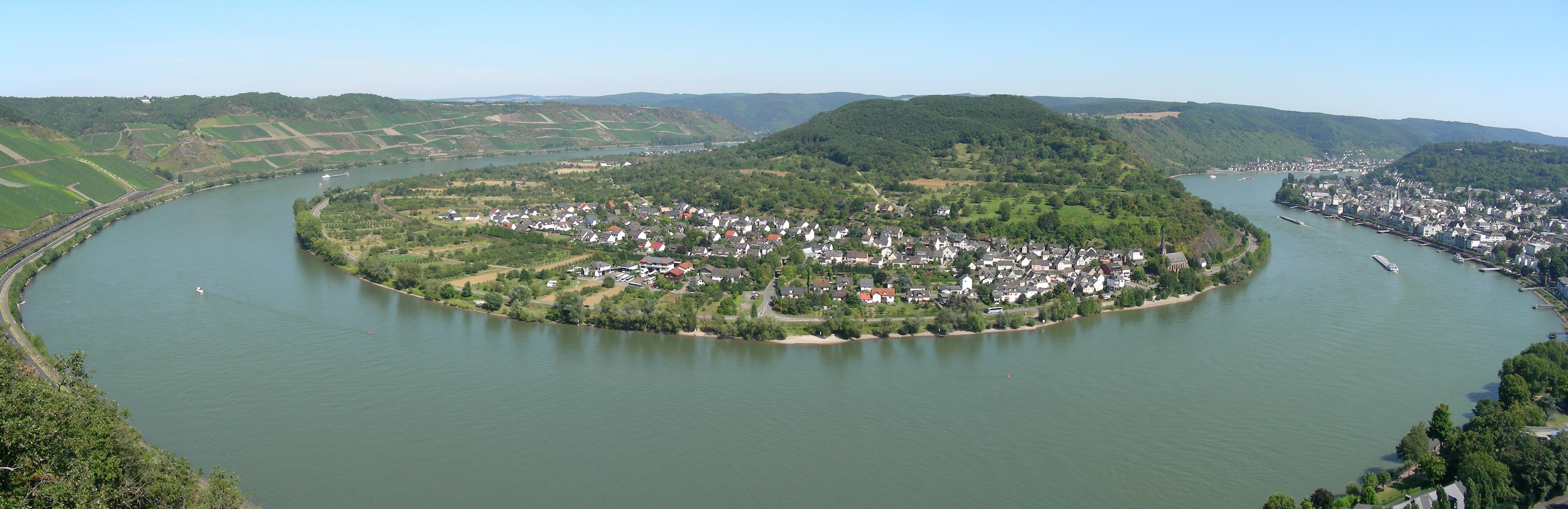
The great bow in the Rhine as seen from the Gedeonseck

The Vierseenblick mentioned above offers a rather obscured view of the Rhine. However, another lookout point nearby affords an outstanding view of the great bow in the Rhine at Boppard. This is the Gedeonseck. In 2006 in this same area, the Mittelrhein-Klettersteig, a via ferrata, was opened. A complete circuit involves eleven different climbs.

=== Dialect ===
People in Boppard speak a dialect known as Bubberder Platt, Bubberder being the dialectal form of Bopparder. Platt is a word used to designate a dialect; it does not refer here to Plattdeutsch (that is, Low German), for Bubberder Platt actually belongs to the Moselle Franconian dialects, and is closely akin to Luxembourgish. A certain degree of kinship with Rhenish and Hessian speech can also be heard. Furthermore, Bubberder Platt also features sporadic Yiddish influences, for until the time of the Third Reich, Boppard had a considerable Jewish community. Outlying Ortsbezirke, too, have their own local Moselle Franconian forms of speech. South of Boppard runs the "Boppard Line", a linguistic boundary that marks the separation of speech populations who say Korf (to the north) or Korb (to the south).

=== Regular events ===
- Närrischer Abendumzug – a "parade of fools" staged by KG Schwarz-Gold Baudobriga 1955 e. V., a local Carnival club, at 18:11 on Quinquagesima (the Sunday before Ash Wednesday); the parade proceeds through the inner town.
- Mittelrheinischer Weinfrühling ("Middle-Rhenish Wine Spring") – a wine festival held along the vineyard paths in the Bopparder Hamm on the last Sunday in April.
- Bopparder Mai – a whole series of events and small festivals in mid May.
- Bälzer Kermes – a kermis held at Whitsun.
- Mittelrhein-Marathon – a marathon run from Oberwesel to Koblenz in June.
- Rheinuferfest ("Rhine Bank Festival") – held on the third weekend in July.
- Niedersburger Kirmes – a kermis held by the neighbourhoods of Upper and Lower Niedersburger Neighbourhoods
- Rhein in Flammen ("Rhine in Flames") – The Bopparder Hamm is the starting point for the convoy of over 80 ships that take visitors to the site of each fireworks display on the second Saturday in August.
- Weinkost ("Wine Sampling") – a small wine festival held in the castle's inner ward on one weekend in August.
- Quetsche-Kirmes in Bad Salzig – a kermis held in early September.
- Zwiwwelsmat (dialectal for Zwiebelmarkt, or "Onion Market") – held on the second Wednesday and Thursday in September.
- Weinfest ("Wine Festival") – held on the last weekend in September and first weekend in October.
- Feuerwehrfest ("Firefighter Festival") – staged by the volunteer fire brigade on the first weekend in September.

== Economy and infrastructure ==
=== Economy ===
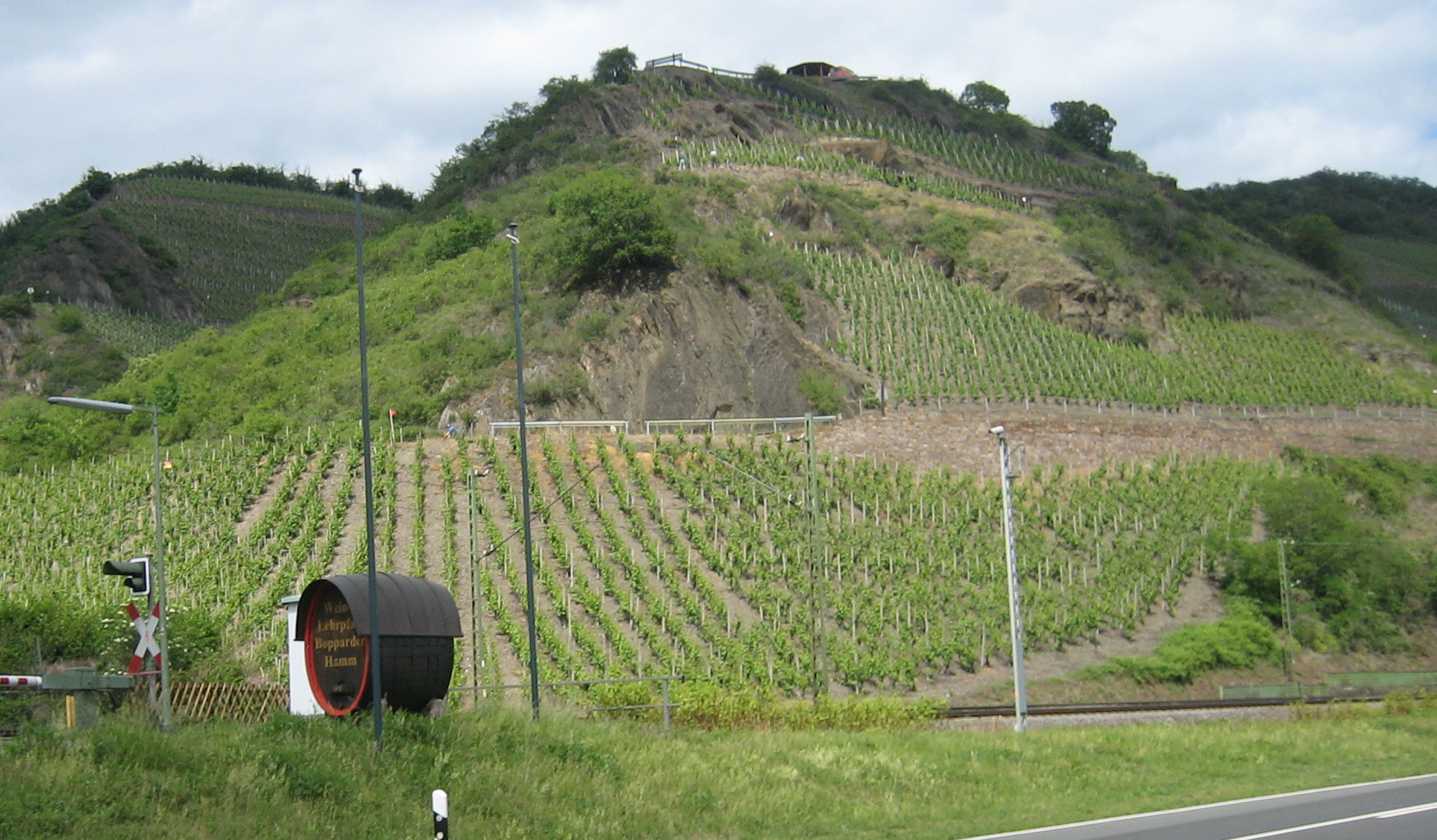
Vineyards in the Bopparder Hamm

Boppard is characterized by winegrowing, which had its first documentary mention in 643. With 75 hectares (190 acres) of planted vineyards, Boppard is the biggest winegrowing centre in the Middle Rhine wine region. Grown here are Riesling, Müller-Thurgau and Pinot noir. Together with Boppard's various other attractions (see above), winegrowing stands as the basis for the town's tourism industry.

=== Established businesses ===
Outside the historic town centre lie many commercial concerns, such as the Boppard-headquartered manufacturer BOMAG, with some 1,200 employees, the cosmetics enterprise Sebapharma GmbH & Co. kg and a software business.

Boppard is known for its Rhine wine, attracting tourists with lodging and dining businesses. From Boppard, excursion ships sail on the Rhine to the Loreley and to Rüdesheim along the stretch of the Rhine Valley with its castles.

=== Transport ===
Ferry Boppard - Filsen

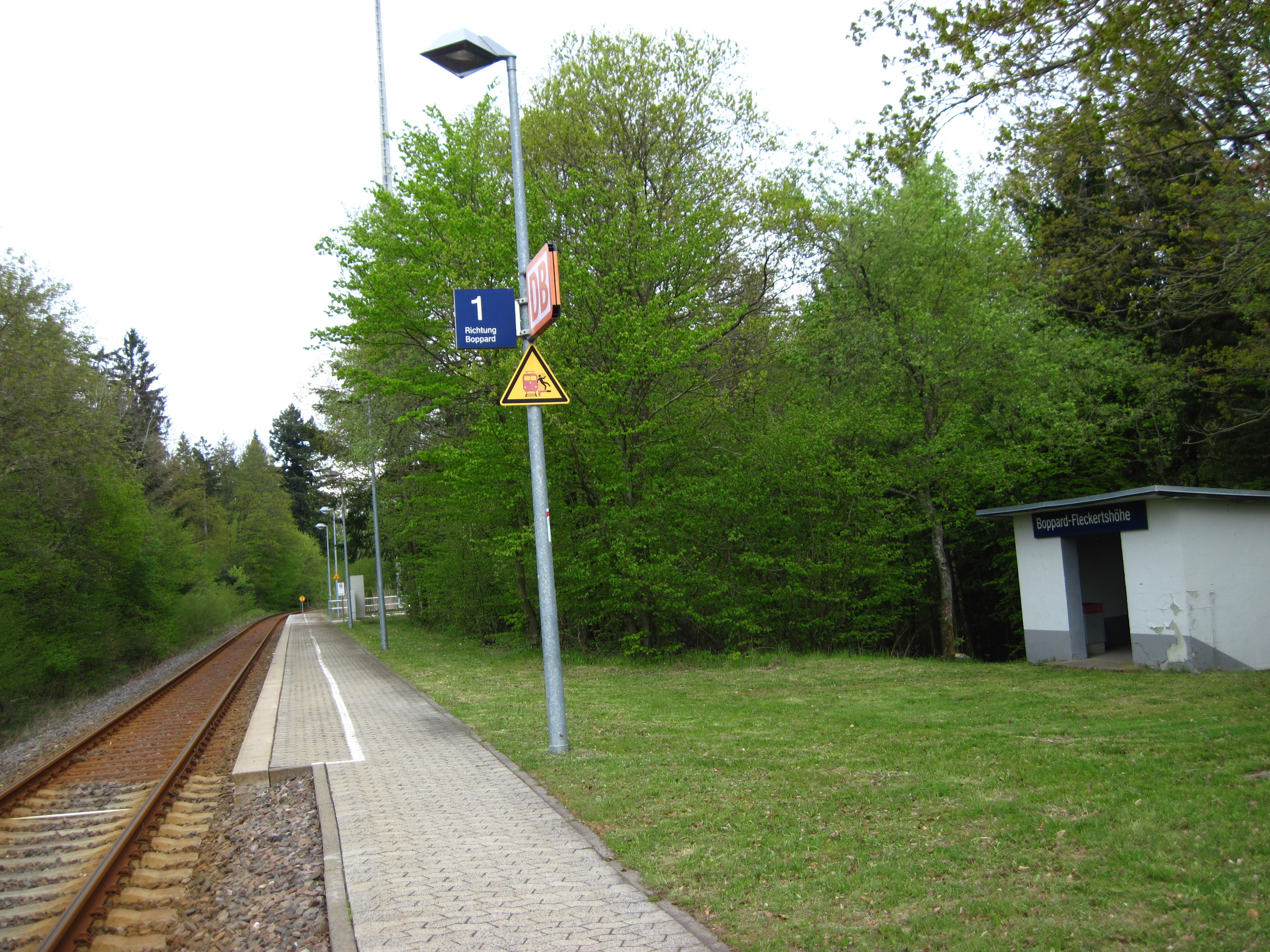
Boppard-Fleckertshöhe stop

Boppard is on the West Rhine Railway (linke Rheinstrecke in German) between Cologne and Mainz, and on the Hunsrück Railway (Hunsrückbahn) between Boppard and Emmelshausen. The town of Boppard has its main railway station, Boppard Hauptbahnhof as well as five halts, Boppard Süd, Boppard-Buchholz, Boppard-Hirzenach, Boppard-Bad Salzig and Boppard-Fleckertshöhe. At the Hauptbahnhof ("Main Station"), two InterCity trains each day, to and from Frankfurt, stop. Further services are run by DB Regio in the form of two-hourly Regional-Express trains on the Koblenz–Bingen–Mainz–Frankfurt route. Local transport has been run since December 2008 by TransRegio; this involves hourly trains between Koblenz and Mainz. Passenger transport on the Hunsrückbahn has since December 2009 been run by Rhenus Veniro. Boppard is located in the area of the transport association Verkehrsverbund Rhein-Mosel (VRM), in the fare zone number 603.

Running through Boppard is the important long-distance highway, Bundesstraße 9. In the outlying centre of Buchholz, furthermore, is an Autobahn interchange onto the A 61, which can be reached by heavy vehicles and those hauling hazardous goods over Landesstraße (State Road) 210 (Simmerner Straße) and by vehicles up to 10.5 t and long-distance buses over Landesstraße 209 (Buchholzer Straße) from the main centre. The Hunsrückhöhenstraße ("Hunsrück Heights Road", a scenic road across the Hunsrück built originally as a military road on Hermann Göring's orders) also runs through Buchholz.

=== Public institutions ===
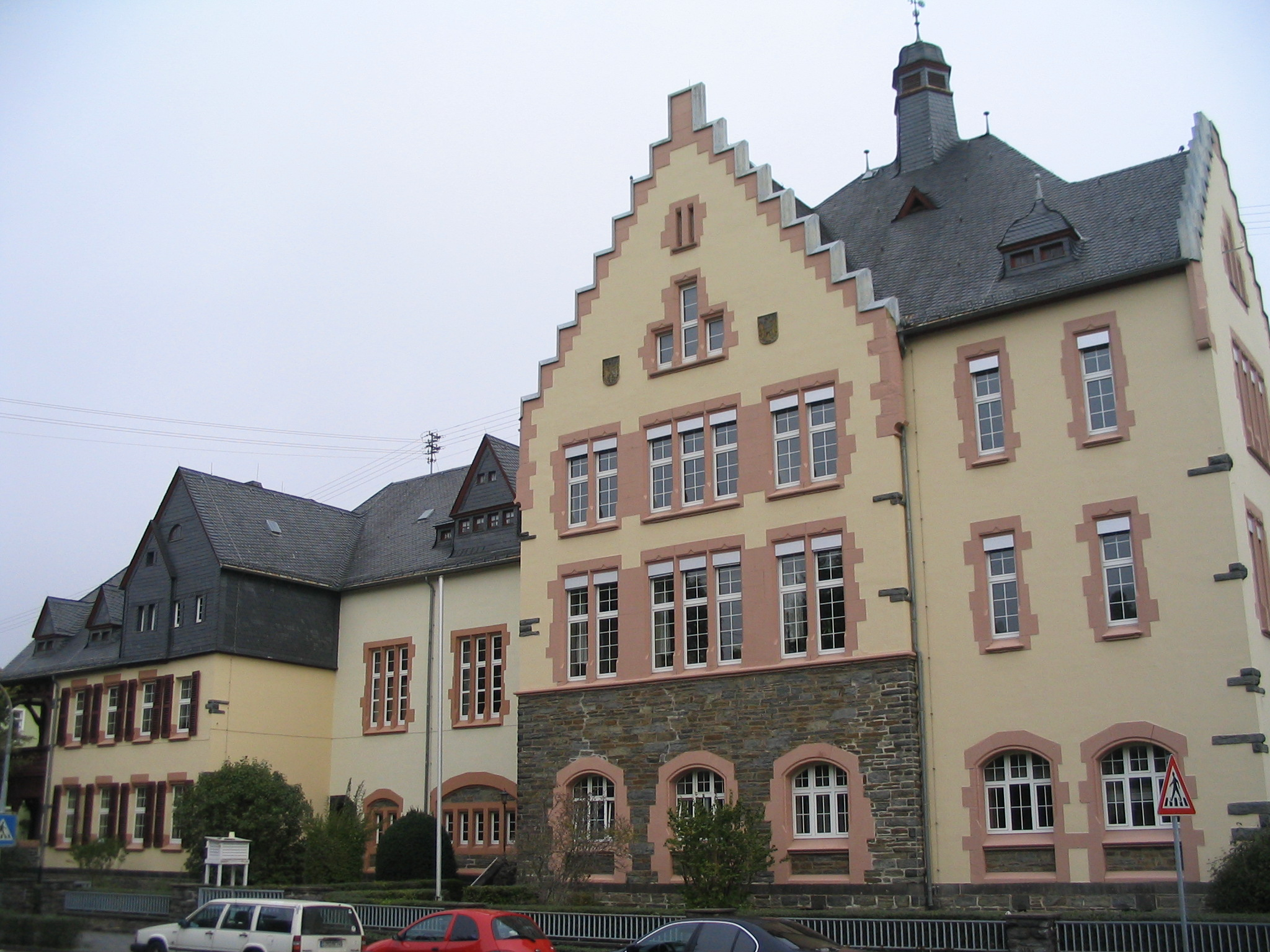
Old building of the Kant-Gymnasium in Boppard

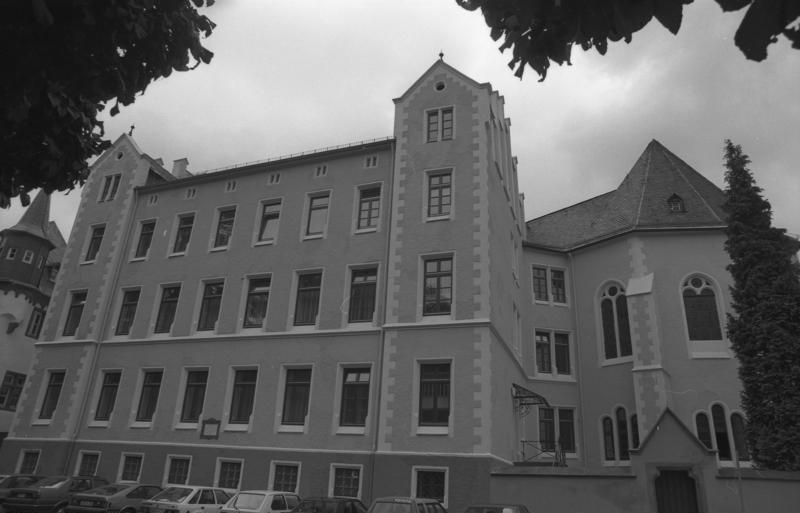
College building for the Federal Academy for Public Administration (1987)

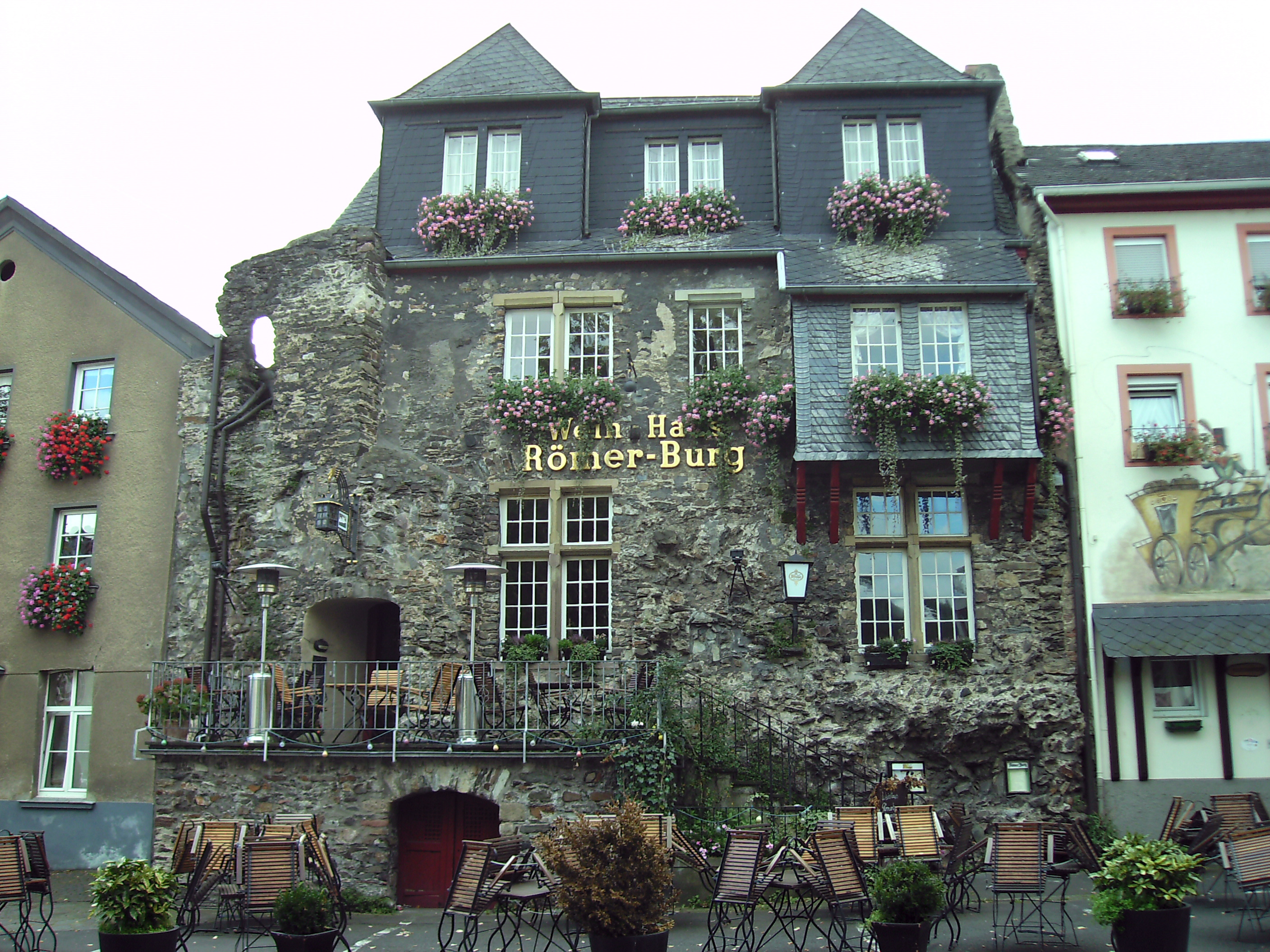
Altstadthaus, locally typical construction (natural slate) with slated roof

==== Education ====
Boppard has three primary schools located in the three biggest Ortsbezirke. Secondary and tertiary schools are all in the main centre of Boppard. These are the Fritz-Straßmann-Schule (Realschule plus), the Bischöfliche Realschule Marienberg, the Kant-Gymnasium Boppard, the berufsbildende Schule ("professional training school") and the Janusz-Korczak-Erzieherschule.

Other educational institutions in Boppard are the Bundesakademie für öffentliche Verwaltung ("Federal Academy for Public Administration"), the Institut für Schulische Fortbildung und Schulpsychologische Beratung ("Institute for Advanced Scholastic Training and Educational-Psychological Counselling") and the medical college.

==== Hospital ====
The Hospital zum Heiligen Geist ("Hospital to the Holy Ghost") is Boppard's oldest social institution. It has two roots, which stretch back to the Middle Ages. One goes back to a donation made by knightly and noble families in Boppard in the mid 13th century, and the other goes back to 1349 when the Boppard Schöffen (roughly "lay jurists") families founded the church brotherhood, or Schöffen brotherhood with the Kleines Hospital ("Little Hospital"). After the French Revolution, both institutions were merged. In 1855, the Sisters of Mercy of St. Borromeo were called to work at the hospital.

In 1956 and 1957, the hospital foundation acquired some buildings right near the hospital that were on the Rhine and on Niederstadtstraße, and in the years that followed, until 1962, the hospital was thoroughly renovated and also expanded. The expansion claimed the Hospitalsgasse ("Hospital Lane") as a victim; this no longer exists. The gynaecology department was housed in the new building on the Rhine and new operating rooms were built on the main floor at the old building. Moreover, the hospital acquired new two- and three-bed rooms. A further expansion building was begun in 1975 and dedicated two years later. Since then, it has been used as a nursing home for seniors.

In January 1999, the focus on psychosomatic medicine was instituted. Four years later in 2003, the Boppard hospital joined together with the Gesundheitszentrum Evangelisches Stift St. Martin Koblenz ("health centre") and the Diakoniezentrum Paulinenstift Nastätten and founded the Verbundklinikum Stiftungsklinikum Mittelrhein, another hospital in Koblenz.

Today, the Hospital zum Heiligen Geist has at its disposal 152 beds. In 2009, work began, funded by the hospital foundation, on a seniors’ home at the Villa Belgrano.

==== Stadthalle ====
In November 2008, a new Stadthalle – literally "town hall", but actually an event venue – was opened in Boppard, right on the marketplace. This new hall offers considerably more room than what was available at the old Hotel Römer, which had had to be torn down owing to fears that it would collapse. The hall is used for both conventions and municipal gatherings on the one hand, and theatrical productions, concerts and comedian acts on the other, and it is also here that Carnival sessions are staged by KG Bälzer Knorrköpp and KG Schwarz-Gold Baudobriga.

==== Museum ====
The museum is housed in the old Electoral castle. On permanent display there are exhibits about the town's history, Michael Thonet and his bentwood furniture, the composer Engelbert Humperdinck and other people somehow linked with the town. Restoration works began in 2005 and in November 2009, the museum was closed for six years a thorough €9,000,000 renovation. This work on the castle building was financed mainly by the Federal world heritage programme. In 2015, the renovated castle and the newly restored museum were reopened.

== Notable people ==
=== People born in Boppard ===
- Michael Thonet (1796–1871), master cabinetmaker, industrialist, held worldwide to be a pioneer in furniture design.
- Franz Peter Knoodt (1811–1889), philosopher and theologian, Old Catholic vicar-general.
- Franz Brentano (1838–1917), philosopher, psychologist and founder of act psychology.
- Heinrich von Siebold (1852–1908), Philipp Franz von Siebold's younger son, called himself "Henry von Siebold", worked first at the Austro-Hungarian embassy in Tokyo, later for the Japanese government. Collected, like his brother Alexander von Siebold Japanese cultural goods and in 1896 republished together with him Nippon. Archiv von Japan, his father's work on the occasion of his 100th birthday.
- Franz Büchner (1895–1991), prominent pathologist.
- Fritz Straßmann (1902–1980), chemist and codiscoverer of nuclear fission.
- Maria Terwiel (1910–1943, executed), German resistance fighter in the Third Reich; she belonged to the group known as the Rote Kapelle.
- Martin Kämpchen (born 1948), author, translator and journalist.
- Hermann-Josef Lamberti (born 1956), financial manager.
- Daniel Tosh (born 1975), American comedian.
- Michael Falkenmayer (born 1982), footballer.

=== Famous people associated with the town ===
- Ottokar I of Bohemia (1155–1230), King of Bohemia from the Přemyslid dynasty, he was crowned in 1198 in Boppard.
- Philipp Franz von Siebold (1796–1866), physician and Japan researcher, lived for some years at Saint Martin's Convent and worked here on his great work Nippon. Archiv von Japan.
- Luise Hensel (1798–1876), teacher at the Marienberg Foundation.
- Engelbert Humperdinck (1854–1921), composer (fairytale opera Hänsel und Gretel), lived and worked for some years in Boppard; for this reason, Boppard citizens have erected a monument to him.
- Boris Skossyreff (1896–1989), Russian adventurer and, as Boris I, self-declared king of Andorra, later lived in Boppard.
- Martin Ebbertz (born 1962), writer and screenwriter, lives in Boppard.

== International relations ==
=== Twin towns – Sister cities ===
Boppard is twinned with:

- Amboise, France
- Ōme, Japan
- (United Kingdom) Truro, Cornwall
