= Hermann-Josef Lamberti =

German banker

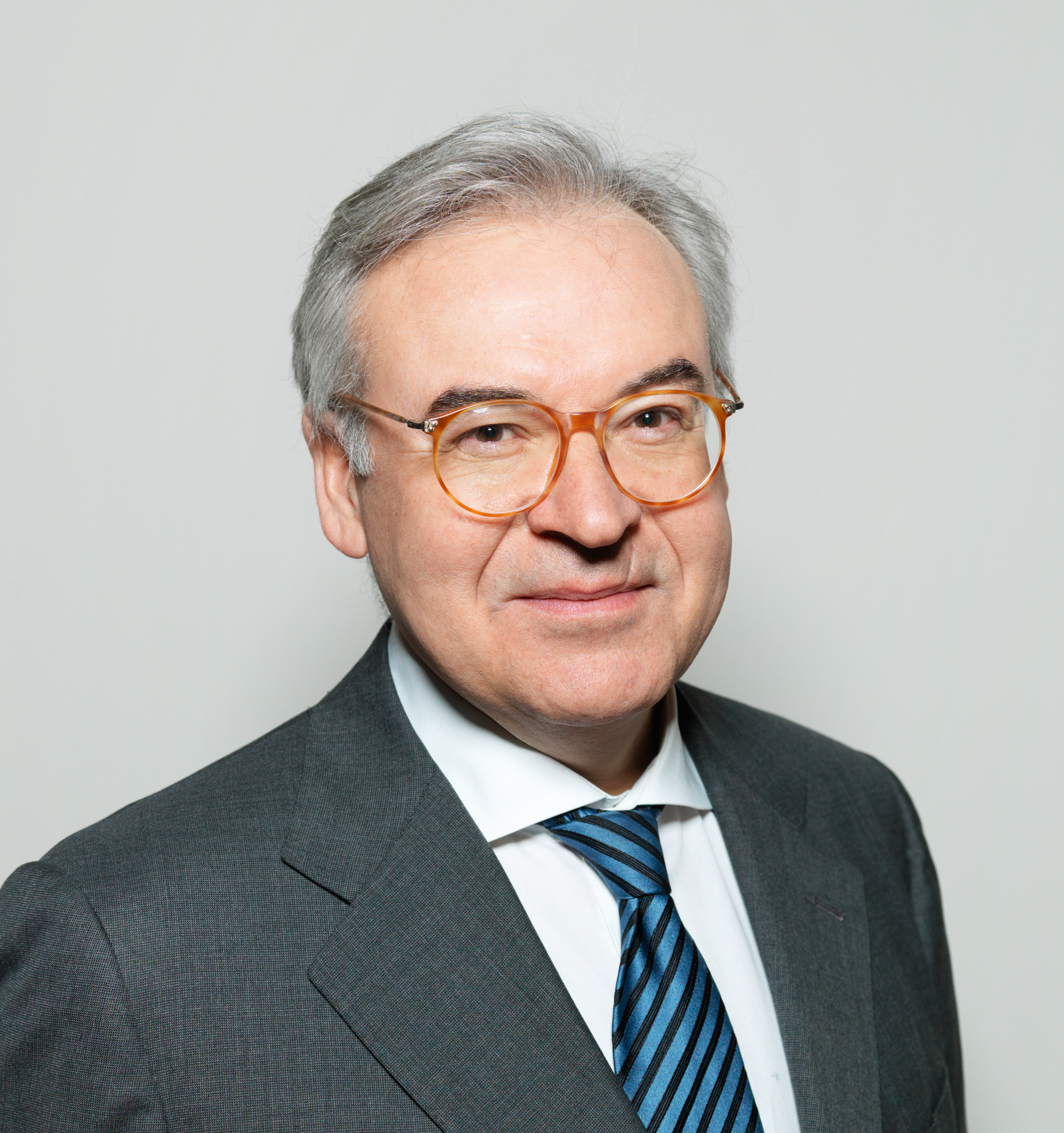
- Hermann-Josef Lamberti (2014)
- Born: February 5, 1956 (age 70); Boppard, Rhineland-Palatinate
- Education: University of Cologne
- Occupation: Banker
- Employer: Deutsche Bank

Hermann-Josef Lamberti (born February 5, 1956) is a German banker and was Chief Operating Officer of Deutsche Bank until May 2012.

Lamberti holds a Diplom degree in business administration from the University of Cologne and a master's degree from Trinity College Dublin. He worked with Deloitte & Touche and IBM before joining Deutsche Bank in 1999. He held the position of Chief Operating Officer from 2002 to 2012.

In an effort to transform the corporate governance structure of EADS and to internationalize its board by reducing the representation of its main Franco-German shareholders, Lamberti was – alongside Lakshmi Mittal, Sir John Parker and Michel Pébereau – elected as one of four non-executive directors of the company in 2007.
