= Bad Salzig =

- Ortsteil of Boppard
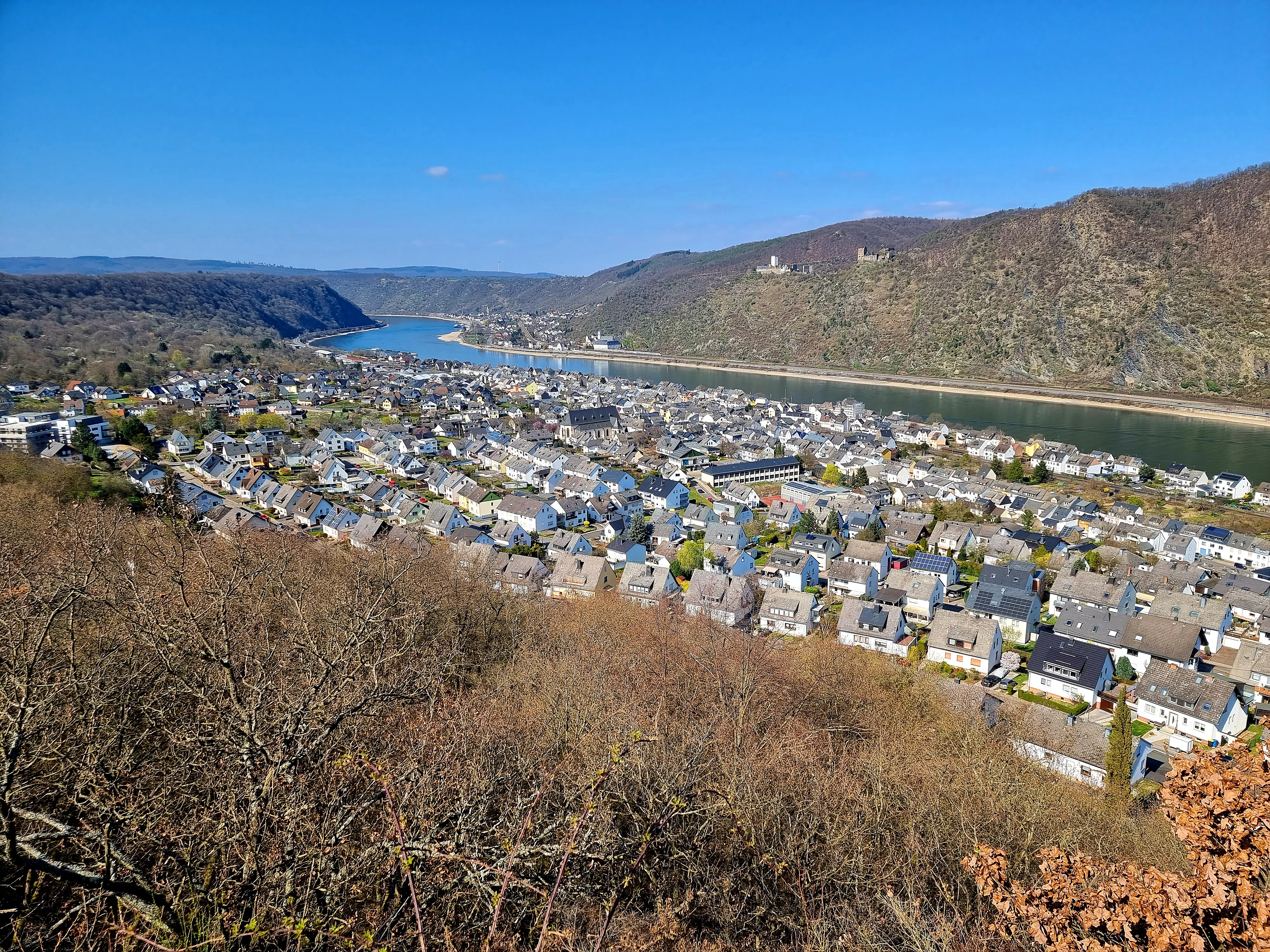

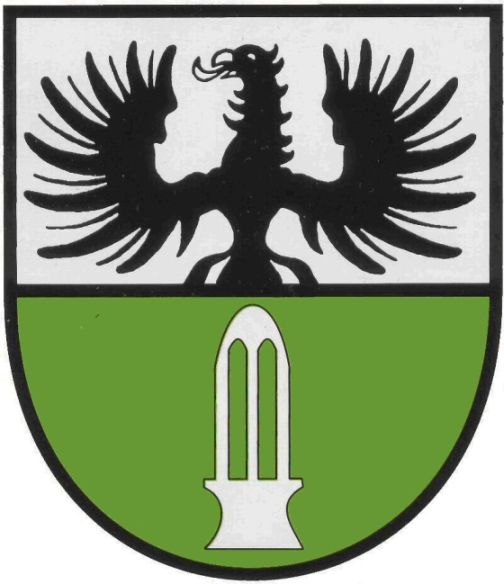
- Coat of arms
- Interactive map of Bad Salzig
- Location within Germany Location within Rhineland-Palatinate
- Coordinates: 50°12′18″N 7°37′59″E
- Country: Germany
- State: Rhineland-Palatinate
- District: Rhein-Hunsrück-Kreis
- Town: Boppard

Government
  - Mayor: Andreas Nick

Area
  - Total: 4.2 km^{2} (1.6 sq mi)
- Elevation: 80 m (260 ft)

Population (2020-12-31)
  - Total: 2,475
  - Density: 590/km^{2} (1,500/sq mi)
- Time zone: UTC+01:00 (CET)
  - Summer (DST): UTC+02:00 (CEST)
- Postal codes: 56154
- Dialling codes: 06742
- Vehicle registration: SIM

Bad Salzig (German pronunciation: [baːt ˈzaltsɪç]) is a small town in Rhineland-Palatinate, Germany, on the west bank of the Rhine. It is part of the municipality of Boppard. It is near the city of Koblenz and the Lorelei. It is a spa town, with a spring which dispenses slightly salty water. It is linked to other towns by a railway which runs form the town's railway station.

== History ==
Bad Salzig is located at the historic Roman Rhine road which went from Mainz to Cologne. A Roman index of places from 215 includes a village called Salissone, but it's uncertain whether Salissone is today's Bad Salzig or not. In 1859 two milestones from the third century were found in the river Rhine, which can be seen in the Rheinischen Landesmuseum at Bonn.

During the Thirty Years' War, Swedish, French, and troops of the Holy Roman Empire occupied Salzig.

In the Nine Years' War troops of Louis XIV conquered Salzig from 1688 to 1689. Moreover, French Revolutionary troops occupied Salzig again and it remained under French control until 1814.

After the Congress of Vienna Salzig was assigned to Prussia.
