= Michael Falkenmayer =

German footballer

Personal information
- Full name: Michael Falkenmayer
- Date of birth: 26 November 1982 (age 43)
- Place of birth: Boppard, West Germany
- Height: 1.83 m (6 ft 0 in)
- Position: Midfielder

Senior career*
| Years | Team | Apps | (Gls) |
| 2003–2004 | FSV Mainz 05 II | 14 | (0) |
| 2003–2005 | FSV Mainz 05 | 8 | (0) |
| 2005–2006 | SV Eintracht Trier 05 | 5 | (0) |
| 2006–2007 | FK Pirmasens | 31 | (0) |
| 2007–2013 | SC Pfullendorf | 163 | (11) |
| 2013–2016 | FSV Mainz 05 II | 47 | (3) |
- * Club domestic league appearances and goals as of 11:02, 19 January 2015 (UTC)

Michael Falkenmayer (born 26 November 1982) is a German retired footballer who played as a midfielder.

== Club career ==
Falkenmayer began his career in 1996 at the TuS Koblenz. From 2003 to 2005 he played in the first team of FSV Mainz 05, for which he played eight games in 2. Liga, but mostly played for the reserves. He then moved for after a year to Eintracht Trier and FK Pirmasens.

Falkenmayer suffered a severe knee injury in his first season with his new club, though he made 31 appearances for them. From the 2007-08 season, he was the regional league SC Pfullendorf under contract for which he completed 163 games in which he scored eleven goals. For the 2011-12 season, he was named as the captain of his club.

In 2013, he resigned for FSV Mainz 05 II. It went well for him, as the club was promoted to 3. Liga.
