= Sebamed =

German skincare brand

- Type: GmbH & Co. KG
- Founded: Boppard, Germany (1957; 69 years ago)
- Founder: Heinz Maurer
- Headquarters: Boppard town district Salzig, Germany
- Products: Clinically tested soap-free skincare products
- Revenue: $ 200 Million (2020)
- Owner: Sebapharma GmbH & Co. KG
- Number of employees: 200 (2020)
- Website: sebamed.com

Sebamed is a German brand name of Sebapharma GmbH & Co. KG, which manufactures medicinal skin care products.

== History ==
Sebamed was established by Heinz Maurer (1921–2016) in 1957. Since 1971, the Sebamed products have been exported to over 70 countries. The headquarters of Sebapharma located in Boppard town district Salzig.

Before Sebamed, Dr. Maurer worked in the dermatological department of the University Clinic Bonn in Germany and was in charge of patients with acute eczema. Patients under Maurer's care were forbidden to wash with soap because soap destroys the therapeutic efforts of doctors treating Dermatitis. Maurer and his ward physician did an unauthorized experiment to clean his patients without using any soap; instead, they used an acid tenside. The results showed that the acid tensides dissolved all the ointments and crusting of eczema, left affected skin free of irritation, kept the areas dry, and made the skin receptive to further treatment.

Dr. Maurer's clinic management was unhappy with the unauthorized experiment. Ultimately, Dr. Maurer left the University of Dermatological Clinic and continued his work in the Paediatric Clinic in Bonn. He continued with his vision of a soap-free cleansing product and carried out scientific trials with acid tensides. Dr. Maurer founded his own company in 1967, introducing the first soap-free cleansing bar into the German market. He originally named the brand SEBUMED but due to a clerical error in the patent office, it was named SEBAMED. Dr. Maurer decided to keep that name. Heinz Maurer was awarded in 2010, the Order of Merit of Rhineland-Palatinate for his business, societal and cultural level. In 2012, Sebapharma had about 200 employees. He was awarded the University Medal "Bene merenti" the University of Regensburg. Dr. Heinz Maurer died on April 22, 2016. In November 1991, the town of Boppard appointed him an honorary citizen, and in 1992, he received the Order of Merit. In 2002, he was awarded at the World Congress of Dermatology in Paris for his life's work.

Sebamed products have been included in over 150 scientific studies to support the brand's formulations and are recognized by dermatologists, pharmacists, Pharmacy, and consumers throughout the world. Since 1971, Sebamed products are now distributed in more than 80 countries. Sebamed's corporate philosophy is "Science for healthy skin." In April 2009, Sebamed won a trademark lawsuit in Indonesia against a local businessman, prohibiting the use of the name Seba.

=== Sebamed product ranges ===
Sebamed products include Classic, Clear Face, Baby Sebamed, Anti-Aging, Anti-Dry, Sun Care, and Visio. They have a pH level of 5.5.

Human skin has a natural hydrolipid barrier, an acid mantle, which retains moisture and lipids while blocking germs, toxins, bacteria, and other outside factors. The acid mantle has a pH of 5.5. Problematic skin conditions, such as Dermatitis, psoriasis, dermatitis, and rosacea, have impaired barrier functions and can have a pH different than 5.5. The acid mantle is a natural barrier that protects the skin from dehydration and environmental damage. The pH of the acid mantle is 5.5, and traditional soap, which has a pH greater than 9, can strip this protective barrier.

Dr. Maurer first discovered that eczema patients are intolerant to soap-based products because they have an impaired acid mantle. At the time of his discovery, eczema patients were told to have bathing prohibitions or not to wash frequently. By pioneering the first soap-free cleansing bar, Maurer showed that eczema patients can wash regularly without affecting the acid mantle. All Sebamed products have a pH of 5.5 to maintain the skin's natural barrier.
