= Martin Ebbertz =

German writer of children's books

Martin Ebbertz (born 1962 in Aachen, Nordrhein-Westfalen, West Germany) is a German writer of children's books.

He grew up in Pruem (Eifel), and studied Germanistik, Philosophy, and History in Freiburg, Münster and Frankfurt. He lived and worked as a free-lance writer first in Frankfurt/Main, then five years in Thessaloniki, Greece. Since Spring 2000 Martin Ebbertz has lived with his wife and two children in Boppard on the Rhine River. In addition to being a writer, he is also a flea market dealer and a second-hand bookseller.

His first children's book Josef, der zu den Indianern will appeared in 1992. His best known book is Der kleine Herr Jaromir, which was also translated into Dutch and Chinese. Many of his children's stories were also published in the German literary radio program broadcast Ohrenbär.

== Bibliography ==
=== Poetry & Prose ===
- Der schönste Platz von Teneriffa. Sports stories. Verlag Am Erker, 1988
- Vier Jahrzehnte Eremiten-Presse. History of a publishing house. Chronicle. Eremiten-Presse 1989
- Alltagsrezepte. Edition Razamba, 2008
- Bestiarium Nonsens. A small lexicon of the most important really strange animal species. Edition Razamba, 2009
- Das Fressverhalten der Mäuse. Stories. Edition Razamba, 2011

=== Children's Book ===
- Josef, der zu den Indianern will. Anrich Verlag, 1992
- Der blaue Hut und der gelbe Kanarienvogel. Verlag St. Gabriel, 1995
- Der kleine Herr Jaromir. Patmos, 2002.
- Onkel Theo erzählt vom Pferd – und 26 weitere total verrückte Geschichten. Moses, 2004
- Karlo, Seefahrer an Land. Coppenrath, 2007
- Pech und Glück eines Brustschwimmers. Sauerländer, 2008
- Der kleine Herr Jaromir findet das Glück. Sauerländer 2008
- Paula, die Leseratte. Razamba 2010

==== Audiobook ====
- Armes Ferkel Anton. Deutsche Grammophon, 1998

== Awards ==
- 1999 "Kinderhörbuch des Monats" (children's audiobook of the month) to Armes Ferkel Anton
- 2002 SR/RB Bestenliste Kinder- und Jugendliteratur (List of best children's literature)
- 2002 "Deutsche Akademie für Kinder- und Jugendliteratur" (German Academy for Children's and Young People's Literature, in Volkach): Kinderbuch des Monats
- 2002 ”Die besten 7 – Bücher für junge Leser", Deutschlandfunk and Focus
- 2005 "Deutsche Akademie für Kinder- und Jugendliteratur": Kinderbuch des Monats (children's book of the month)
- 2006 Belgian Youth Literature Prize (nominationlist)
- 2008 SR/RB Bestenliste Kinder- und Jugendliteratur
