= Middle Rhine =

Section of the river Rhine in Germany

Middle Rhine (Mittelrhein)
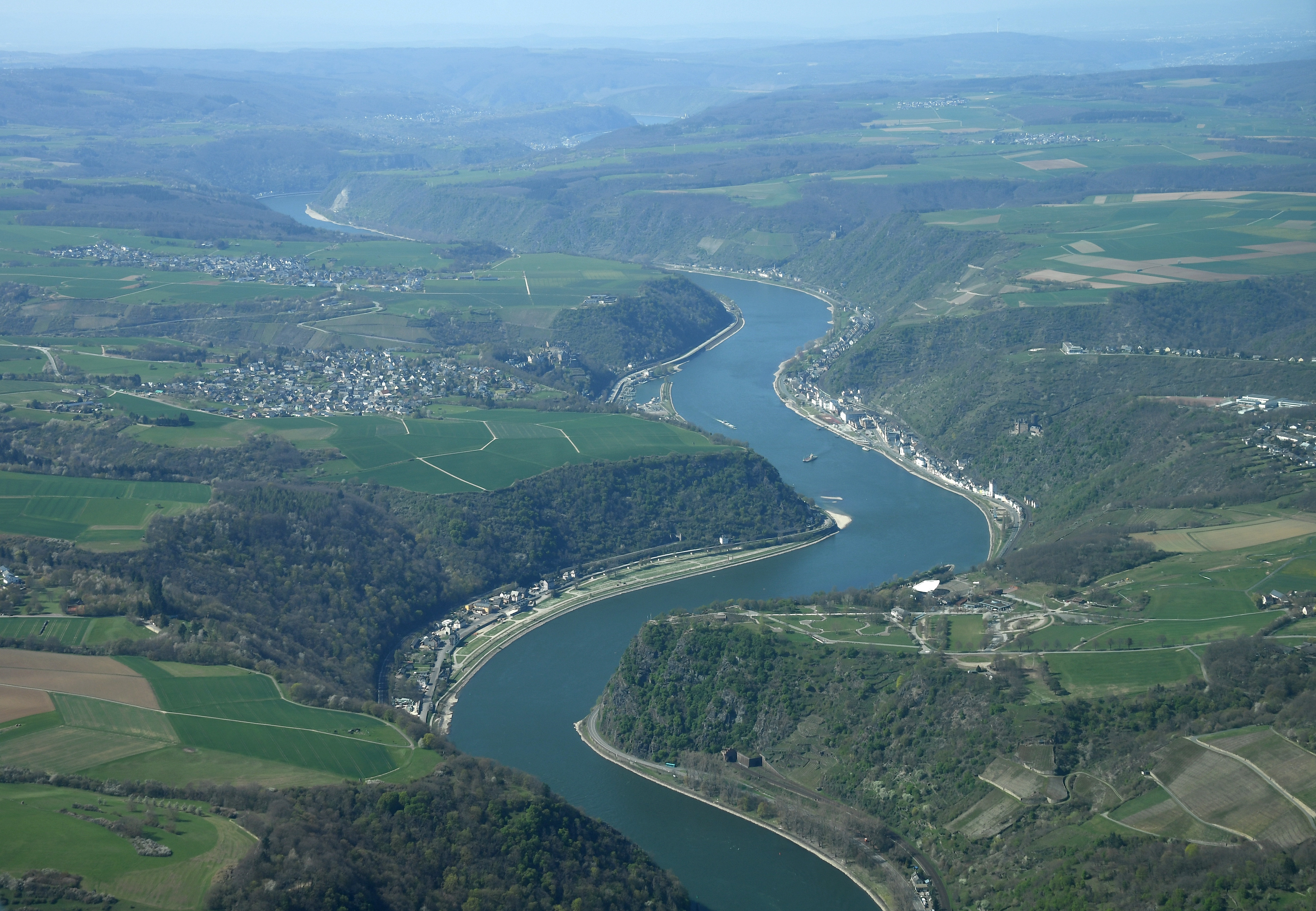
- Sankt Goarshausen and Lorelei rock (bottom)

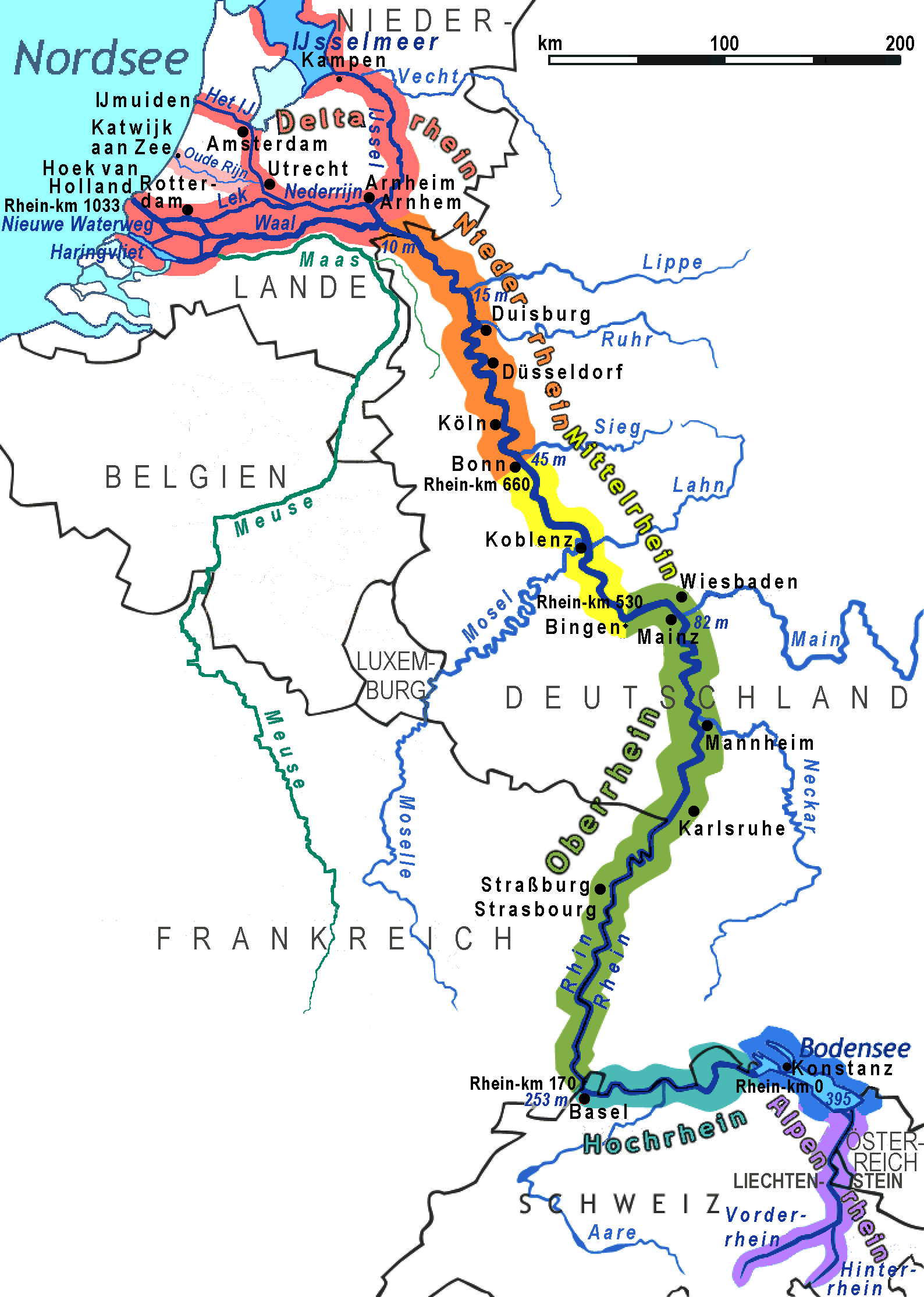
- Sections of the Rhine: Rhine–Meuse–Scheldt delta Lower Rhine Middle Rhine Upper Rhine High Rhine Lake Constance (Untersee, Seerhein, Obersee) Alpine Rhine, Vorderrhein, Hinterrhein Rhine sources

Location
- Country: Germany
- States: Hesse, North Rhine-Westphalia, Rhineland-Palatine
- Districts: Ahrweiler, Bonn, Koblenz, Mainz-Bingen, Mayen-Koblenz, Neuwied, Rhein-Hunsrück, Rhein-Lahn, Rhein-Sieg, Rheingau-Taunus

Physical characteristics
- Source
  - location: Rhine knee at Bingen am Rhein, continuation of the Upper Rhine
  - coordinates: 49°58′11″N 7°53′21″E
  - elevation: 89 m
- Mouth
  - location: Between Bad Godesberg and Bonn-Oberkassel, continues as Lower Rhine
  - coordinates: 50°42′20″N 7°9′46.2″E
  - elevation: 61 m
- Length: 130 km (81 mi)

Basin features
- Tributaries
  - left: Ahr, Moselle, Nahe, Nette
  - right: Lahn, Wied

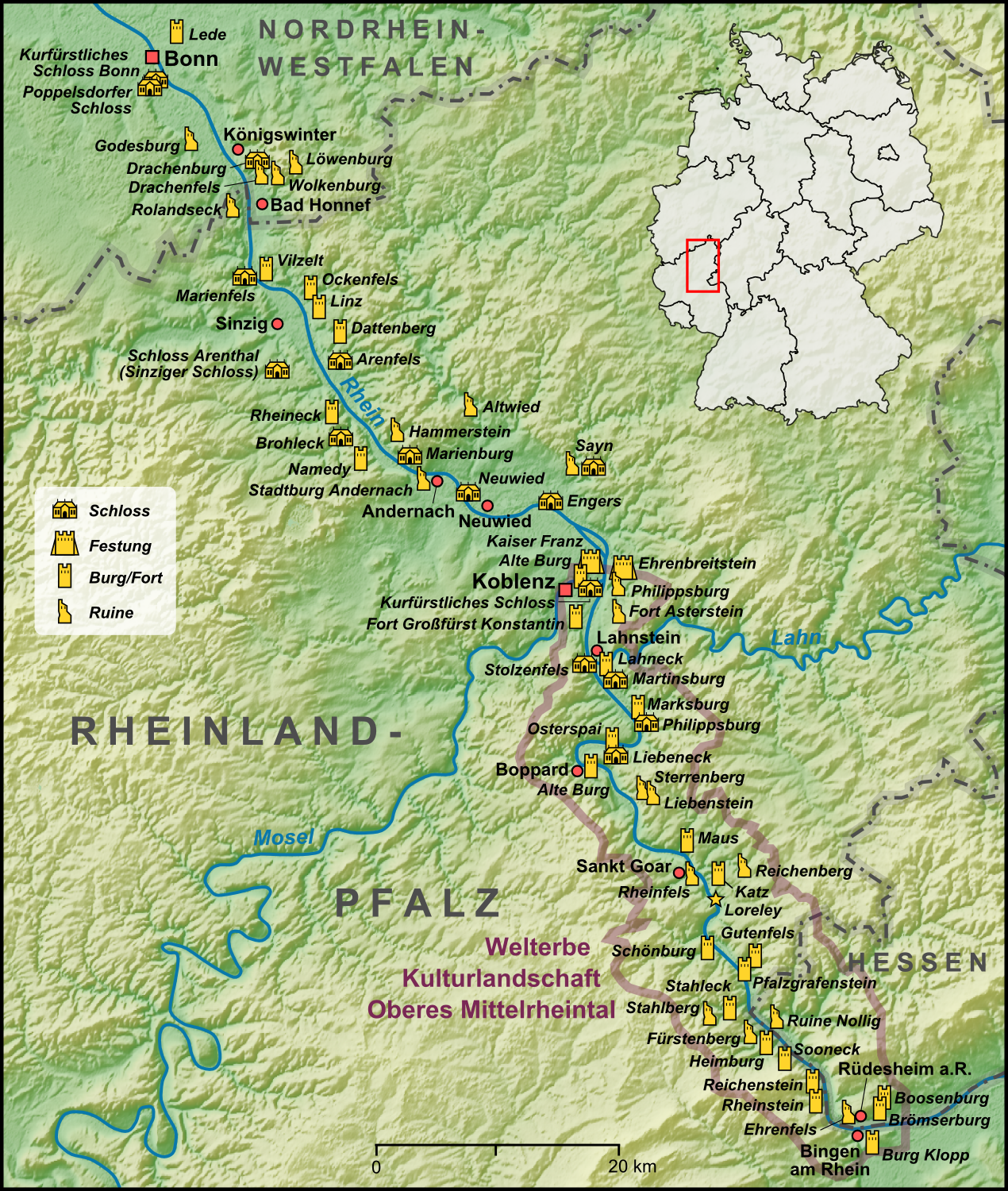
Map of the Middle Rhine

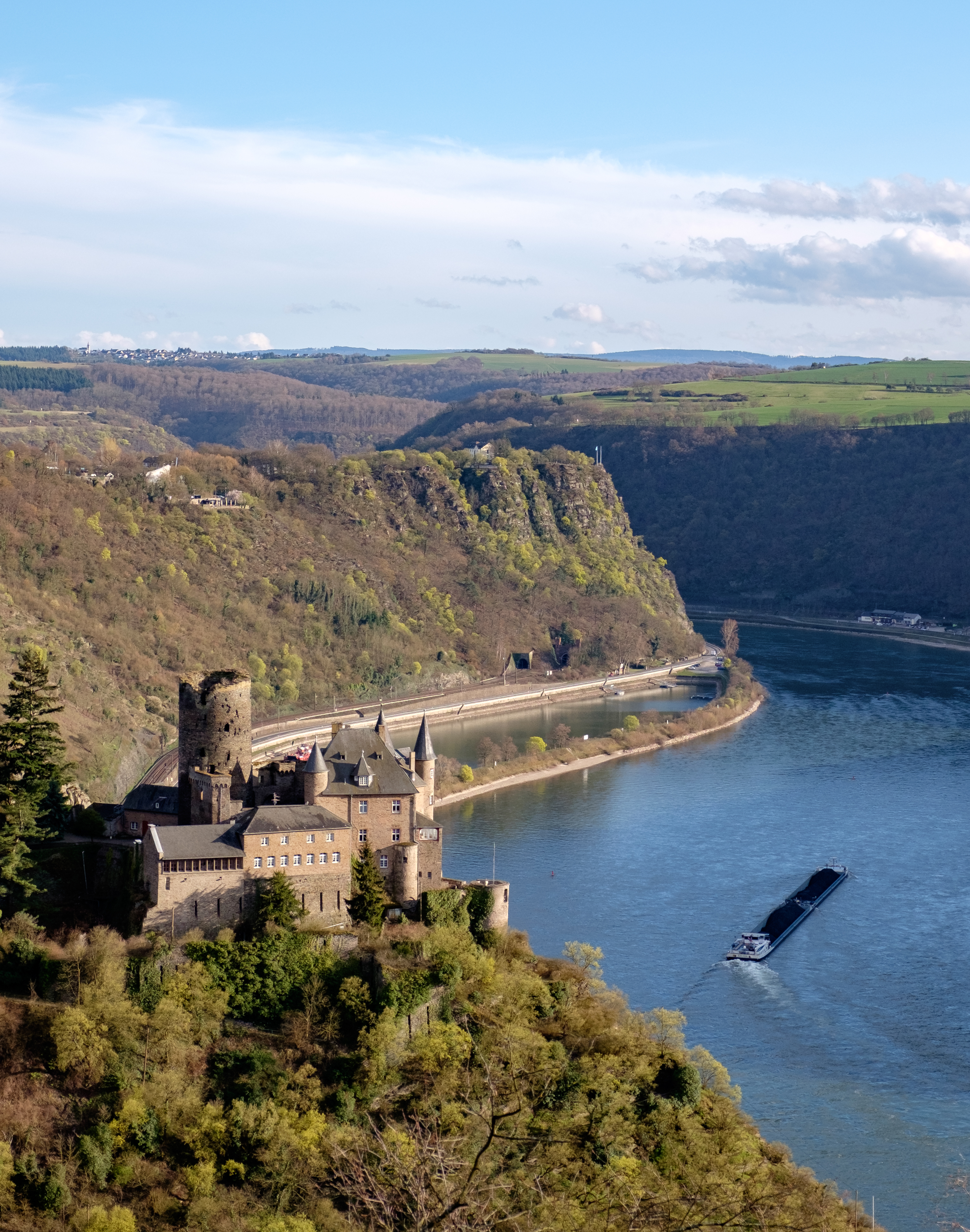
St. Goarshausen, Burg Katz, with Lorelei rock in Rhineland-Palatinate

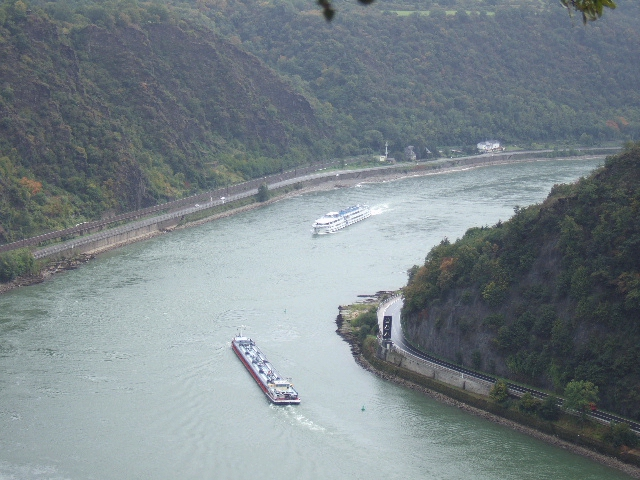
View from the Loreley

Middle Rhine (German: Mittelrhein, pronounced [ˈmɪtl̩ˌʁaɪn]; kilometres (Note: The kilometrage of the Rhine begins at the Old Rhine Bridge in the city of Konstanz (Constance) and ends at the Hook of Holland at the North Sea.) 529 to 660 of the Rhine) is the section of the Rhine between Bingen and Bonn in Germany. It flows through the Rhine Gorge (Oberes Mittelrheintal), a formation created by erosion, which happened at about the same rate as an uplift in the region, leaving the river at about its original level, and the surrounding lands raised. This gorge is quite deep, about 130 metres (430 ft) from the top of the rocks down to the average water-line.

The Middle Rhine is one of four sections of the Rhine between Lake Constance and the North Sea (the others being the High Rhine, Upper Rhine and Lower Rhine). The upper half of the Middle Rhine (Rhine Gorge) from Bingen (Rhine-kilometer 526) to Koblenz (Rhine-kilometer 593) is a UNESCO World Heritage Site, a striking cultural landscape with more than 40 castles and fortresses from the Middle Ages, unique terraced vineyards, and many wine villages. The lower half, from Koblenz (Rhine-kilometer 593) to Bonn (Rhine-kilometer 655), is famous for the formerly volcanic Siebengebirge, with the Drachenfels volcano. Both parts together are known as "the romantic Rhine".

The Middle Rhine Valley has been a major tourist attraction since the 19th century. It is also home to some 450,000 people. The valley owes its special appearance to both its natural shape and human alterations. For two millennia, it has been one of the most important routes for cultural exchange between the Mediterranean region and northern Europe. Situated in the heart of Europe, it was sometimes a border and sometimes a bridge between different cultures. The history of the valley reflects the history of Western Europe. With its many outstanding monuments, its hills full of vines, its settlements crowded on the narrow river banks, and the rows of castles lined up on the hill tops, it is considered the epitome of the Rhine romanticism. It inspired Heinrich Heine to write his famous poem "Lorelei" and Richard Wagner to write his opera Götterdämmerung.

The vineyards along the Middle Rhine form a wine-growing region of the same name.

== Geography ==
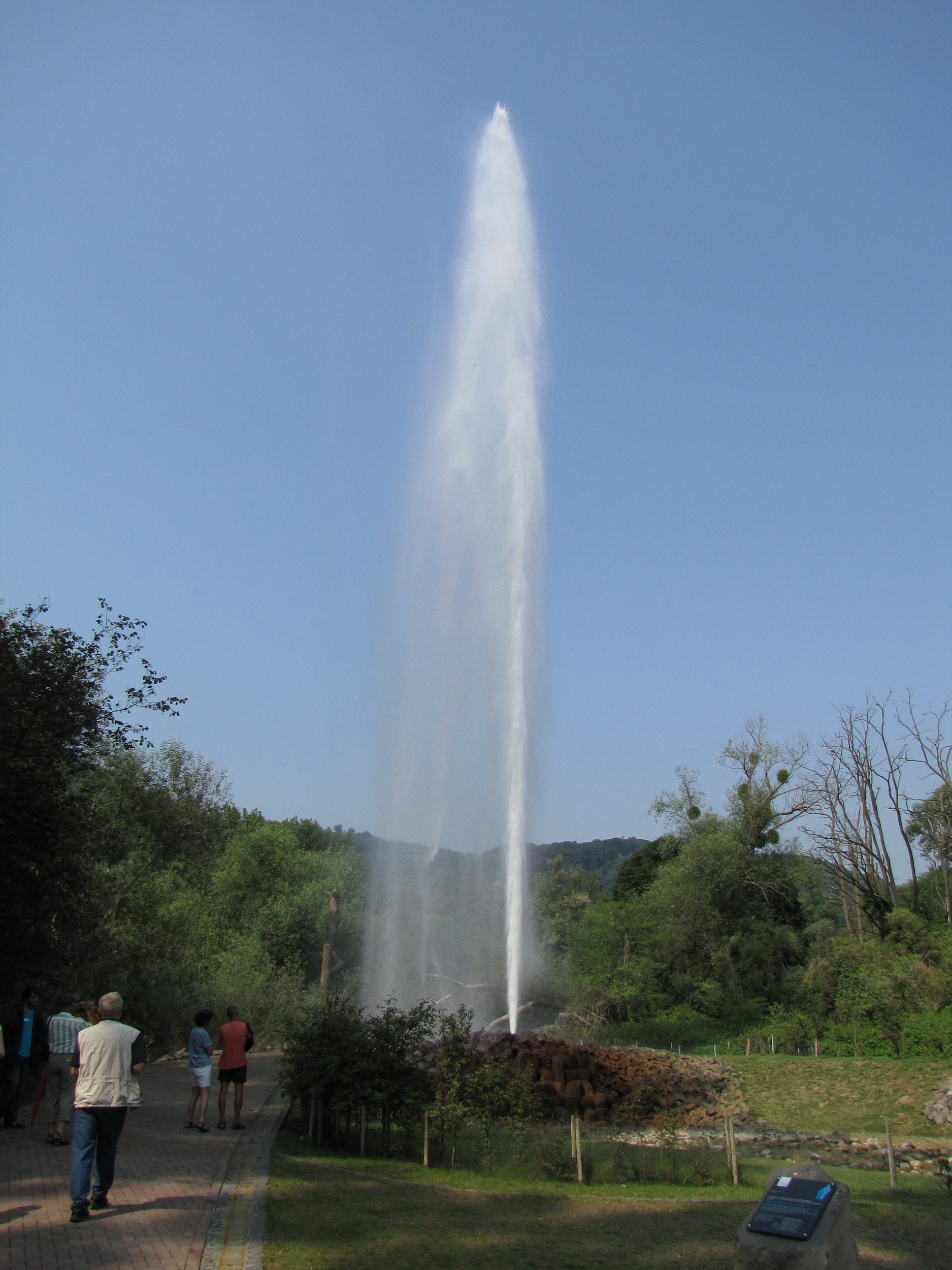
The Andernach Geyser, the highest cold-water geyser in the world

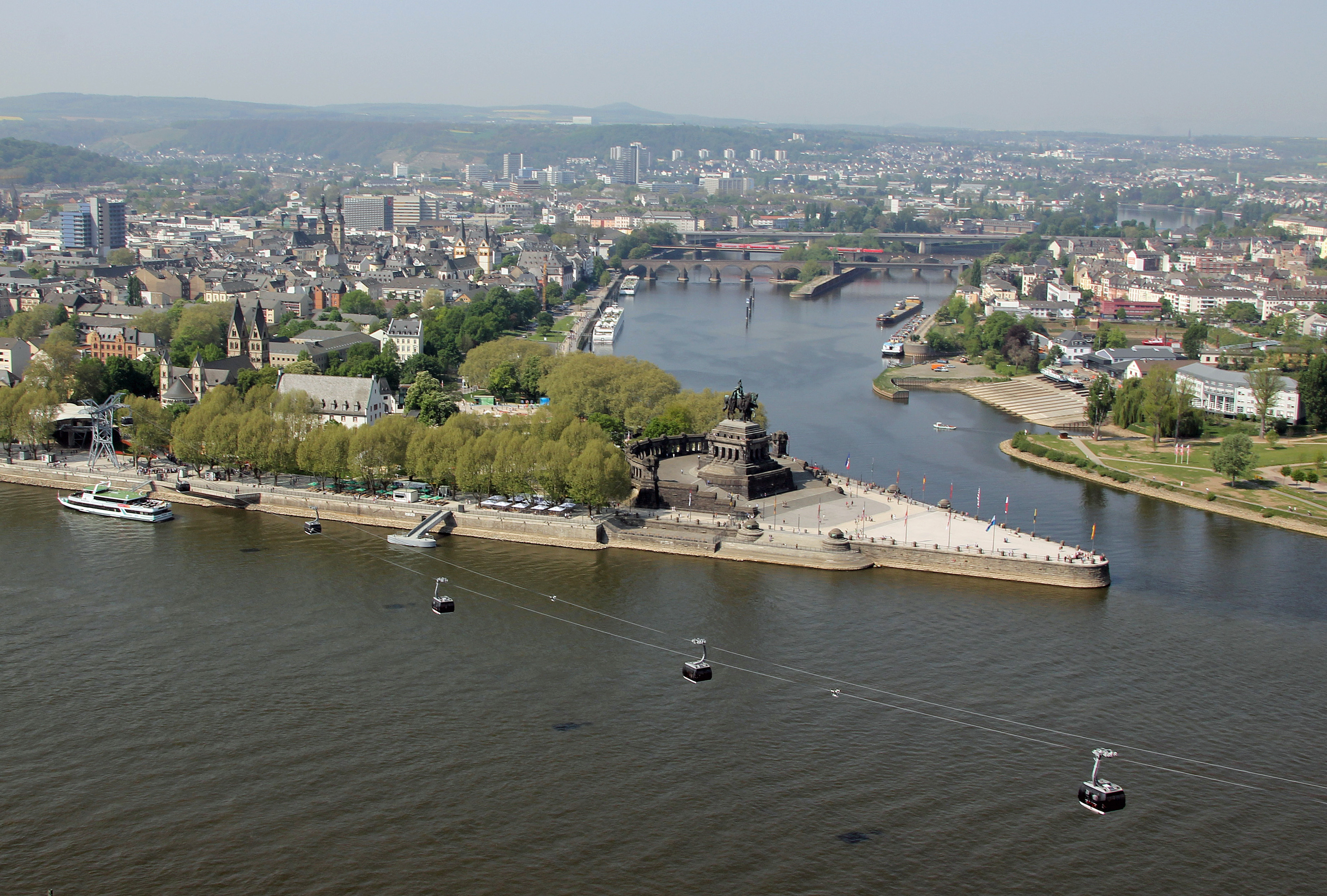
Deutsches Eck ("German Corner") at the confluence of Rhine and Moselle in Koblenz

=== Location ===
The Rhine Gorge is the narrow gorge of the Rhine flowing through the Rhenish Slate Mountains between Bingen am Rhein and Rüdesheim am Rhein in the South and Bonn-Bad Godesberg and Bonn-Oberkassel in the North. Between Rüdesheim and Lorch, the left bank belongs to the German state of Rhineland-Palatinate; the right bank belongs to the wine region of Rheingau in the state of Hesse. Downstream of Lorch, both banks belong to Rhineland-Palatinate until the river crosses the border with North Rhine-Westphalia shortly before Bonn.

The Middle Rhine basin at Neuwied separates the upper and lower halves of the Middle Rhine. On the Namedyer Werth peninsula (between Rhine-kilometer 614.2 and 615.5), is the Andernach Geyser, which at 50 to 60 metres (160 to 200 ft) is the highest cold-water geyser in the world. On 7 July 2006, the geyser was reactivated for tourists.

=== Transport ===
There are major railway lines on both sides of the river: the West Rhine Railway on the left and the East Rhine Railway on the right. Major roads are the federal roads B9 and B42, and the Rhine itself is a major international waterway.

=== Towns and cities ===
The most important cities on the left bank are Bingen, Bacharach, Oberwesel, St. Goar, Boppard and Koblenz on the Upper Middle Rhine and Andernach, Bad Breisig, Sinzig, Remagen and Bonn on the Lower Middle Rhine. On the right bank are Rüdesheim, Assmannshausen, Lorch, Kaub, St. Goarshausen, Braubach and Lahnstein on the Upper Middle Rhine and Vallendar, Bendorf, Neuwied, Bad Hönningen, Linz am Rhein, Bad Honnef and Königswinter on the lower part.

=== Tributaries ===
Larger tributaries on the left include Nahe, Moselle and Ahr; on the right Lahn and Wied.

== Castles, fortresses and palaces ==
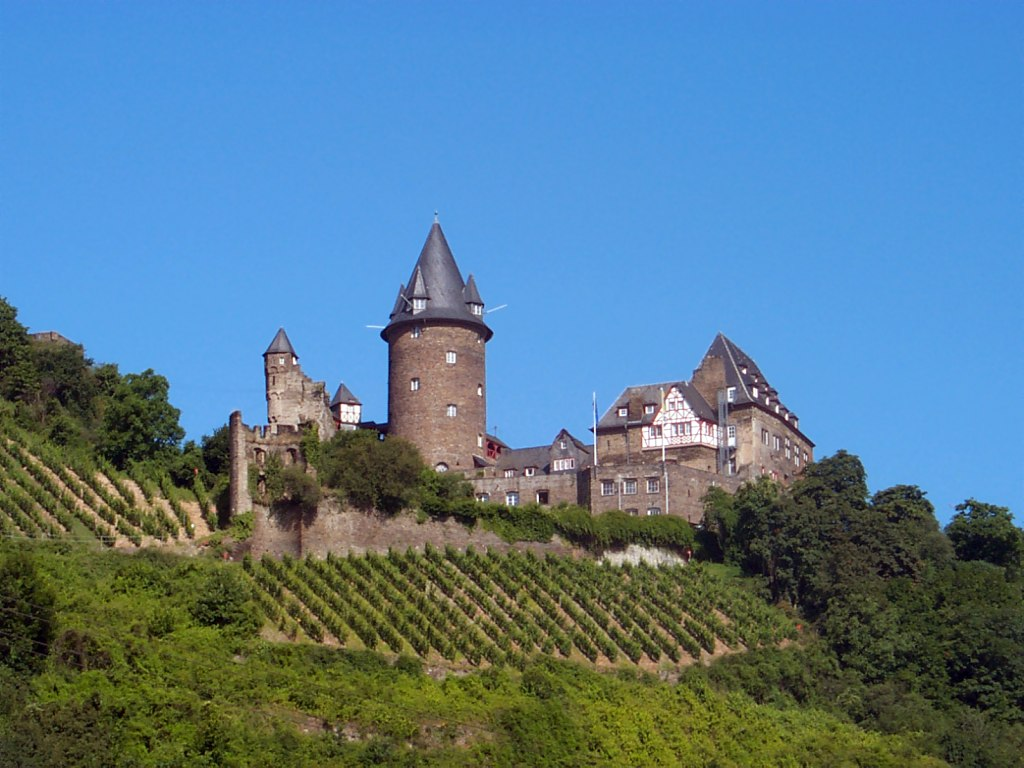
Stahleck Castle at Bacharach

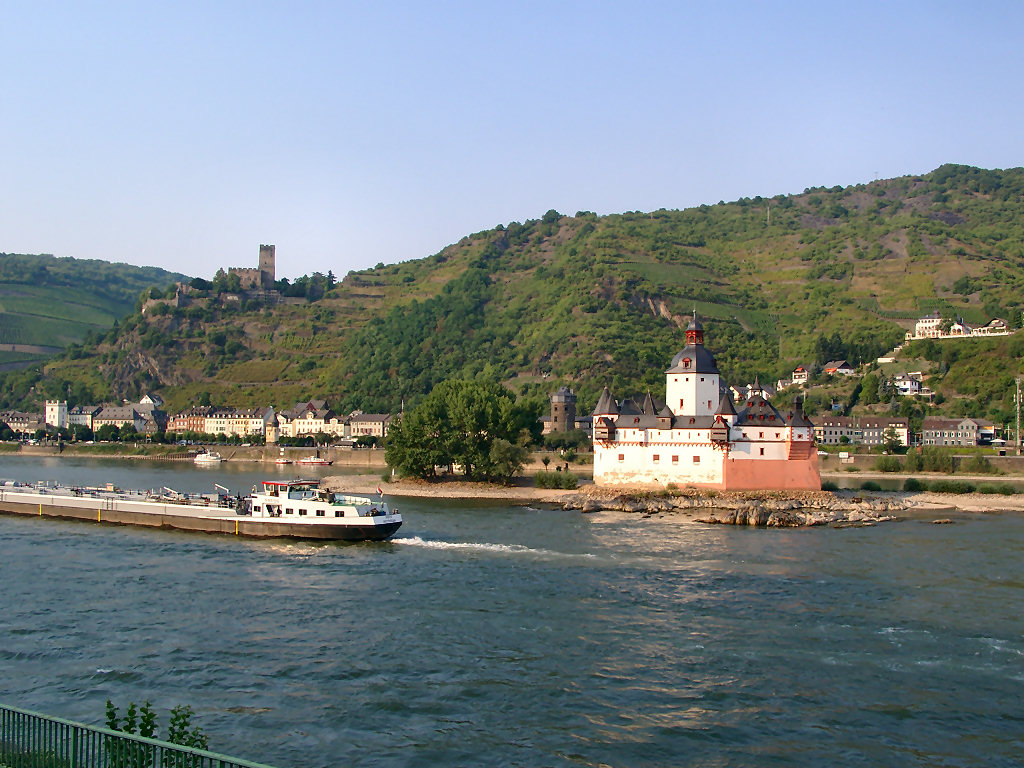
Burg Pfalzgrafenstein at Kaub

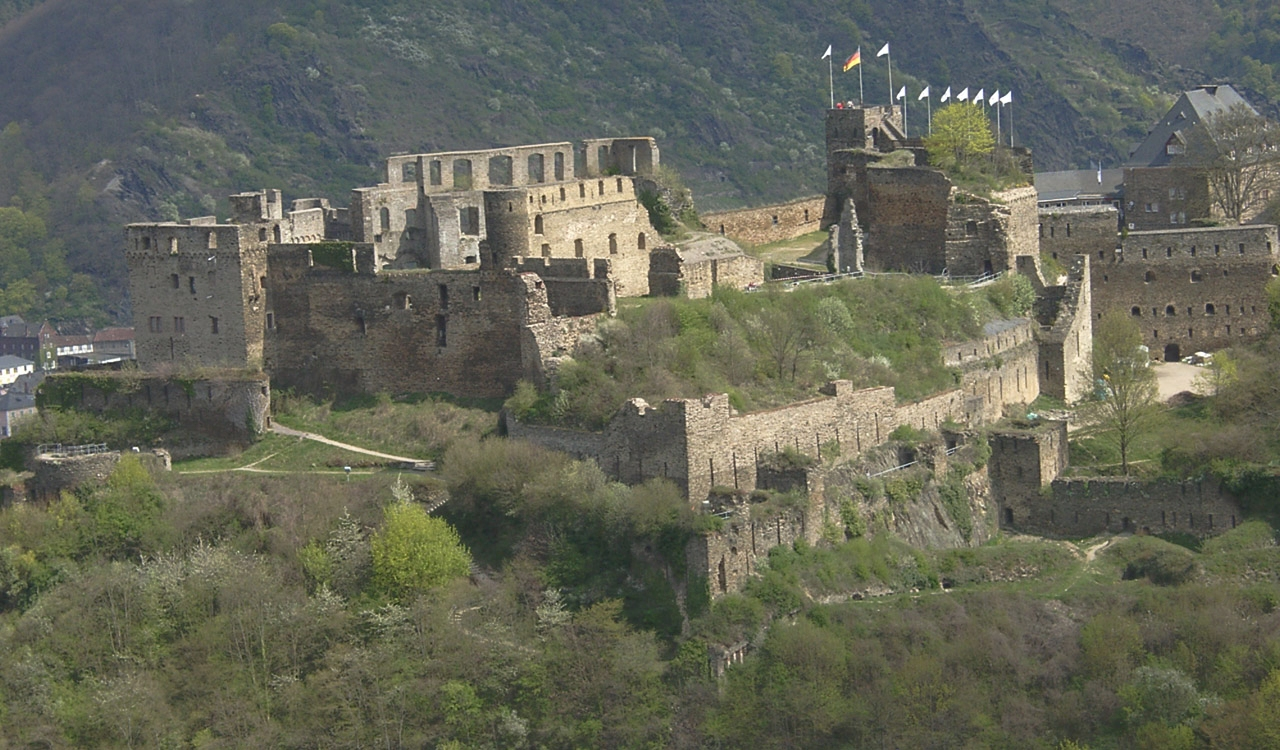
Burg Rheinfels at St. Goar

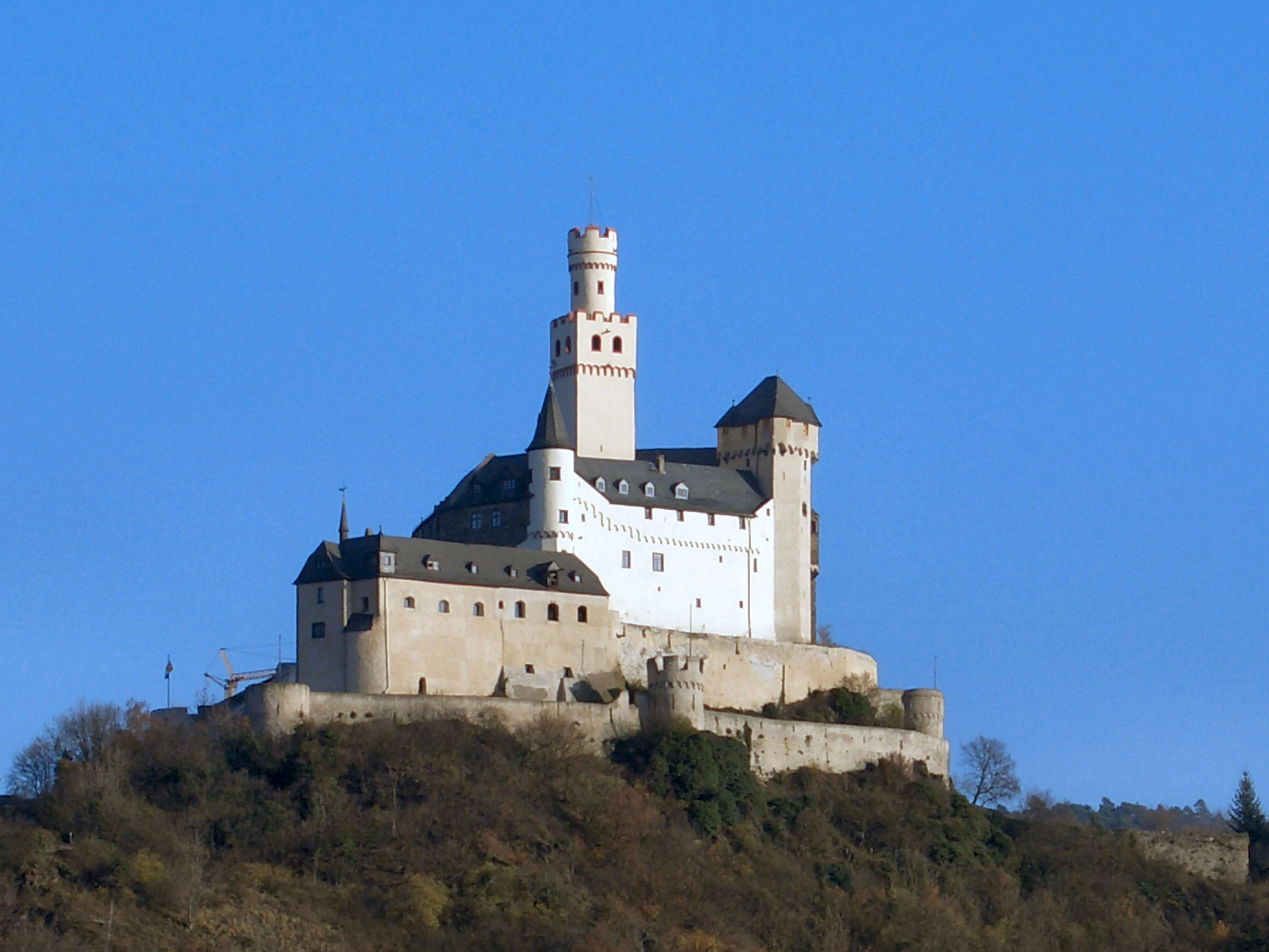
Marksburg at Braubach

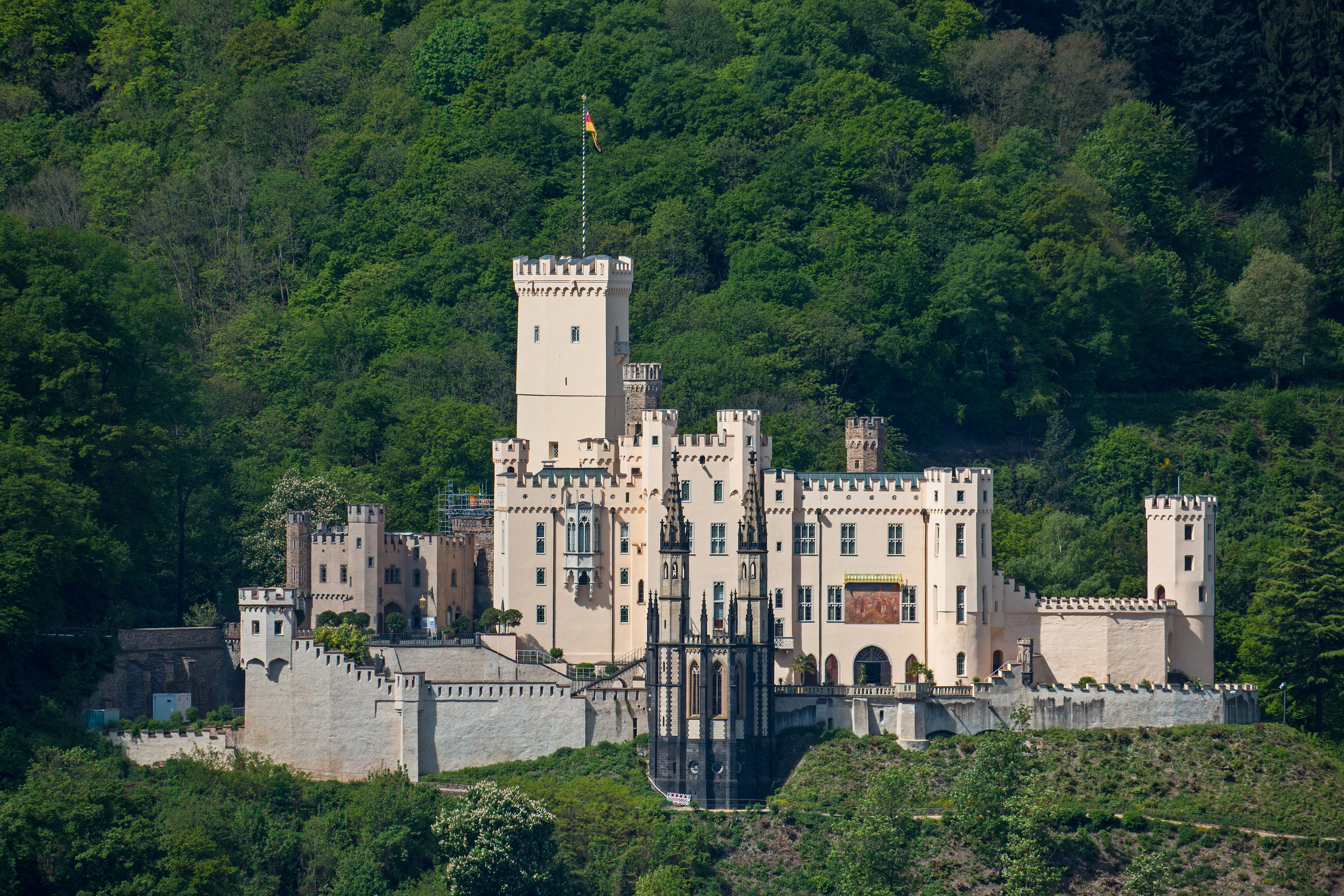
Stolzenfels Castle at Koblenz

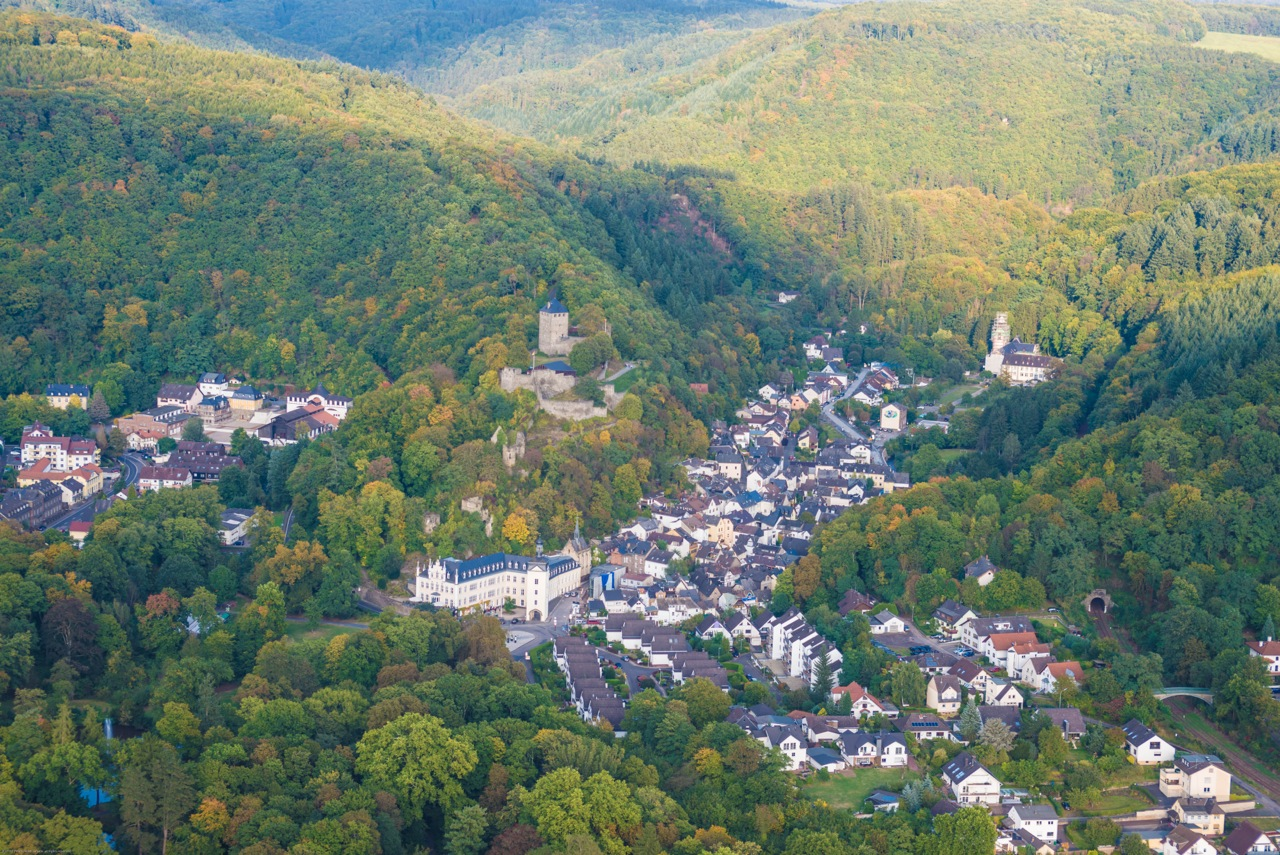
Burg and Schloss Sayn

The most outstanding castles are the Marksburg, the only undamaged hilltop castle in the Middle Rhine Valley, the Burg Pfalzgrafenstein, on a rocky island in the middle of the Rhine, and Rheinfels Castle, which was developed into a fortress over time. Stolzenfels Castle is a synonym for Rhine romanticism like no other. It did not just encourage the acceptance of the existing castles, it also encouraged their restoration and the building of even more castles. The Electoral Palace in Koblenz was the last residence of the Electors of Trier. It was demolished by the French revolutionary army. The most powerful fortress in Rhineland-Palatinate, Koblenz Fortress, was built in the 19th century by the Prussians. Ehrenbreitstein Fortress, once part of the fortification system, dominates the Rhine Valley to this day.

The following castles are found along the Middle Rhine, in downstream order:

Left bank
- Klopp Castle
- Trutzbingen
- Rheinstein Castle
- Reichenstein Castle
- Sooneck Castle
- Heimburg in Niederheimbach
- Fürstenberg Castle
- Stahlberg Castle
- Stahleck Castle
- Schönburg Castle
- Rheinfels Castle
- Alte Burg (Boppard)
- Stolzenfels Castle
- Fort Großfürst Konstantin
- Alte Burg (Koblenz)
- Electoral Palace (Koblenz)
- Kaiser Franz Fortress
- Stadtburg Andernach
- Namedy Castle
- Schloss Brohleck
- Rheineck Castle
- Sinzig Castle
- Schloss Marienfels
- Rolandseck Castle
- Godesburg
- Poppelsdorfer Schloss
- Electoral Palace, Bonn
Right bank
- Boosenburg
- Brömserburg
- Vorderburg
- Ehrenfels Castle
- Nollig Castle
- Pfalzgrafenstein Castle
- Gutenfels Castle
- Katz Castle
- Reichenberg Castle
- Maus Castle
- Liebenstein Castle
- Sterrenberg Castle
- Schloss Liebeneck
- Osterspai Castle
- Schloss Philippsburg (Braubach)
- Marksburg
- Schloss Martinsburg
- Lahneck Castle
- Fort Asterstein
- Schloss Philippsburg (Koblenz)
- Ehrenbreitstein Fortress
- Schloss Sayn
- Sayn Castle
- Schloss Engers
- Schloss Neuwied
- Altwied Castle
- Marienburg Castle
- Hammerstein Castle
- Schloss Arenfels
- Dattenberg Castle
- Linz Castle
- Ockenfels Castle
- Vilzelt Castle
- Löwenburg Castle
- Wolkenburg Castle
- Drachenfels Castle
- Drachenburg Palace
- Lede Castle

== History ==
=== Prehistory ===
The terraces of the Middle Rhine Valley have been inhabited since the early Iron Age. Evidence of this are the barrow fields around the city forest of Boppard and in the forest of Brey and the ring walls on the Dommelberg in Koblenz and on the giant hill at St. Goarshausen. On the western border of the Middle Rhine region, there are also traces of a Celtic settlement, with the grave pillar of Pfalzfeld and the Waldalgesheim chariot burial. In the 4th century BCE, the area had come under the influence of Mediterranean civilizations. The north-south link between mouth of the Nahe and the Moselle estuary rich already in use in pre-Roman times. The Roman development of the route overlaps in large sections with the route of the modern Bundesautobahn 61

=== Roman period ===
The Romans settled in the area of the Middle Rhine from the mid-1st century BC to about 400 AD. An important factor was the construction of the Roman Rhine Valley Road between the provincial capitals Mainz and Cologne along the left bank of the Rhine, both on the plateau (northbound from Rheinböllen) as on the left bank in the Valley (the route of the modern highway Bundesautobahn 9). The Rhine was the border of the Roman Empire, which is why the road had to be constructed on the left bank, just inside the Empire.

Traces of significant road construction have been identified near Stahleck Castle at Bacharach. The cities of Bingen (Bingium) and Koblenz (Confluentes) are the sites of early Roman fortresses, and Oberwesel (Vosolvia) housed a Roman Mansio. The fortresses protected agriculture and natural resources against the Germanic tribes of the Tencteri, Usipetes, Menapii and Eburones. The agricultural settlements in the hinterland provided for the people in the cities and military camps.

The Romans used the Rhine for shipping. In the 1st century CE, bridges were constructed at Koblenz across the Rhine and the Moselle. In 83—85 a limes was constructed between the Rhine and the Danube, to protect a weak section of the border. In the 2nd century, the Romans ventured onto the right bank of the Rhine and constructed a fortress at Niederlahnstein. Emperors Constantine and Valentinian safeguarded the frontier by constructing fortresses in Koblenz are (Confluentes) and Boppard (Bodobrica) with strong walls and round towers, of which remnants remain.

In the 5th century, the Alamanni and Franks forced the Romans to withdraw from the area. They took over the Roman cities and the Franconians began founding new cities of their own. Unlike the old Roman cities, the new Franconian cities were independent of the old Roman farmsteads; agriculture and livestock farming took place inside the city. These cities can be recognized by their names ending in -heim.

At the end of the 5th century, the Merovingian king Clovis founded the Franconian Kingdom. Although the Roman population of the area declined steadily, the people spoke a Franco-Roman dialect and the language of administration was Latin. Grave inscriptions from the 4th to the 8th century in Boppard, in the St. Severus Church and the Carmelite Church prove the survival of a small Roman population in addition to the Frankish immigrants.

=== Middle Ages ===
The Roman settlements, especially the fortified cities in the Middle Rhine Valley, were taken by the Franconian Kings as Crown possessions. Almost all of the territory between Bingen and Remagen, including the cities of Bacharach, Oberwesel, St. Goar, Boppard, Koblenz and Sinzig, were in royal ownership. The enfeoffment of individual parts of the empire began in the 8th century and continued until the early 14th century. Beneficiaries of the gifts were, among others, the abbots of Prüm and Trier and of the Abbey of St. Maximin and the Archbishops of Cologne, Trier, Mainz and Magdeburg. The Counts of Katzenelnbogen are also governors of the Abbey of Prüm and this allow them to establish their own territory around their seat Burg Rheinfels Castle in St. Goar. When the male line of the Counts dies out in 1479, this territory is inherited by the Landgraves of Hesse.

The grandsons of Charlemagne split his Empire in the Treaty of Verdun of 843, which they prepared in the Basilica of St. Castor in Koblenz in 842. The left bank of the Rhine between Bacharach and Koblenz falls to Middle Francia. In 925, Middle Francia is finally becomes the Duchy of Lorraine within East Francia, the German Empire. The Rhine remains the heartland of the royal power, or Vis maxima regni as Otto of Freising called it, until in 1138 Conrad III is elected King of Germany in Koblenz, the first King of the House of Hohenstaufen.

=== Late Middle Ages ===
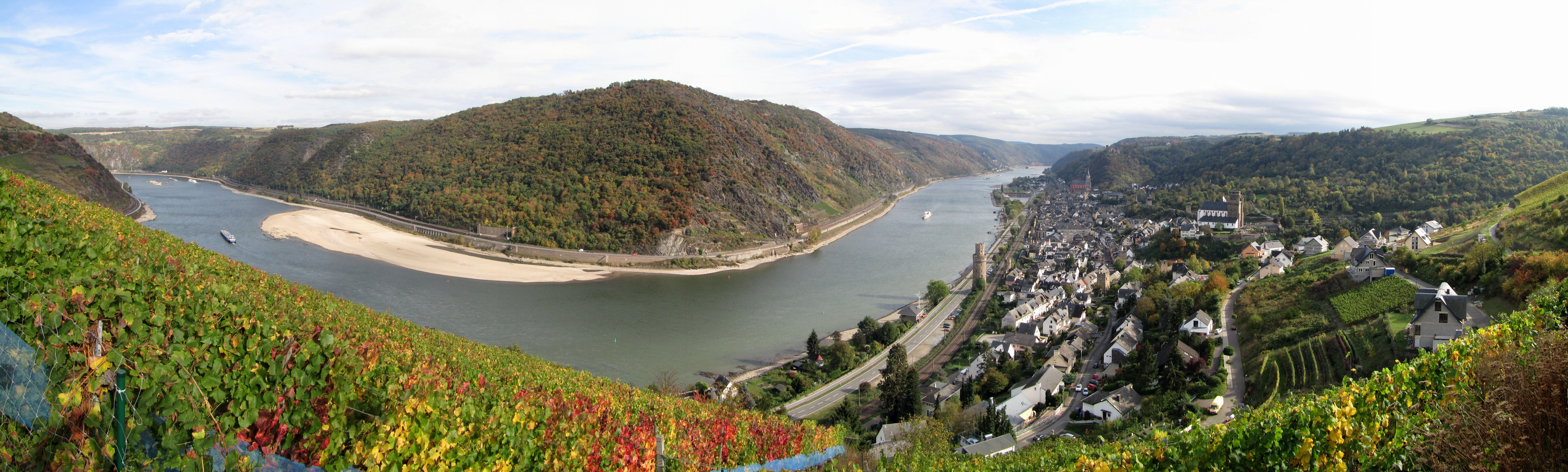
The Middle Rhine Valley at Oberwesel

The late Middle Ages were marked on the Middle Rhine by the territorial fragmentation. In addition to the spiritual Electors of Cologne, Mainz and Trier, the Count Palatine had gained influence on the Middle Rhine since Hermann of Stahleck in 1142. Most of the forty castles in the area between Bingen and Koblenz arose during this period as a sign of mutual competition.

These castles are interesting examples of late medieval military architecture. They were partly influenced by developments in France, Italy and the Crusader states. The Counts of Katzenelnbogen in particular, excelled as castle builders. They built the Marksburg, Rheinfels Castle, Reichenberg Castle and Katz Castle. Another outstanding ruler in the 14th century was Elector and Archbishop Baldwin of Trier from the House of Luxembourg. His brother King Henry VII, Count of Luxembourg and Roman-German King from 1308, had pledged him the imperial cities of Boppard and Oberwesel, two of the around twenty cities and towns established on the Rhine between Bingen and Koblenz in the 13th and 14th century that had city rights and similar freedoms. Not all of those city rights have resulted in effective urban development, but in almost all these places more or less extensive remnants of the fortifications remain to this day.

Boppard and Oberwesel resisted of integration into a modern territorial state for a long time. Boppard fought battles for the freedom of the city in 1327 and 1497. The grave stone in the popular "wide-track bully" type in the Carmelite church of Boppard of the knight Sifrid of Schwalbach, who fell in 1497, is a testimony to this struggle for local liberties which erupted for the last time in the Palatine Peasants' War of 1525. The City Castle of Boppard, built by Baldwin of Trier in 1340, however, is a monument of the suppression of urban autonomy by territorial princes.

Since the territories of the four Rhenish electors lie close together on the Middle Rhine, these cities have been the venue for countless historically important events, such as imperial diets, electoral diets, royal elections and princely weddings. The most important of these events was the Declaration of Rhense in 1338. Boppard was especially frequently visited ed by German Kings and Emperors. The rulers would then reside with their entourage in the Königshof ("Royal Court"), outside the city gate. Bacharach was a founding member of the League of Rhine Cities in 1254. King Louis IV the Bavarian resided in Bacharach at the time. The painted Volto Santo by Lucca in the local St. Peter's church is testimony to the reverence for the reverence Louis held for the Lucca archetype and the cultural exchange between imperial Italy and the Middle Rhine.

=== Modern Period ===
Landgrave by Philip the Magnanimous of Hesse introduced the doctrine of the Reformation in the Katzenelnbogn area in 1527. In 1545 the Reformation reached the area of the Electorate of the Palatinate through Elector Frederick II.

The Thirty Years' War broke out in 1618 from the struggle between the Catholics and the Protestants and the political tensions in the German Empire. France, Spain and Sweden intervened. When peace was established in 1648, the country was economically ruined with and half the population having died from the fighting, disease or famine.

During the 17th century, the Middle Rhine was increasingly the scene of a long-lasting conflict between Germany and France. After devastation of the Thirty Years' War, the War of the Palatine Succession brought in 1688–1692 further destruction of castles and fortifications part of the cities' defenses. The city of Koblenz was reconstructed in the 18th century and is characterized by the style of early classicism.

After the French Revolutionary Wars, the left bank of the Rhine was annexed by the French Republic and later the French Empire. Prefect Lezay-Marnésia, who resided in Koblenz began restoring the road on the left bank, which had not been maintained after the Romans had left and had fallen into disuse. He also promoted fruit production in the Middle Rhine (for example, cherry growing in Bad Salzig, like it was practiced in Normandy). This partly replaced the viticulture, which had declined sharply at the end of the 18th century.

=== 19th century ===
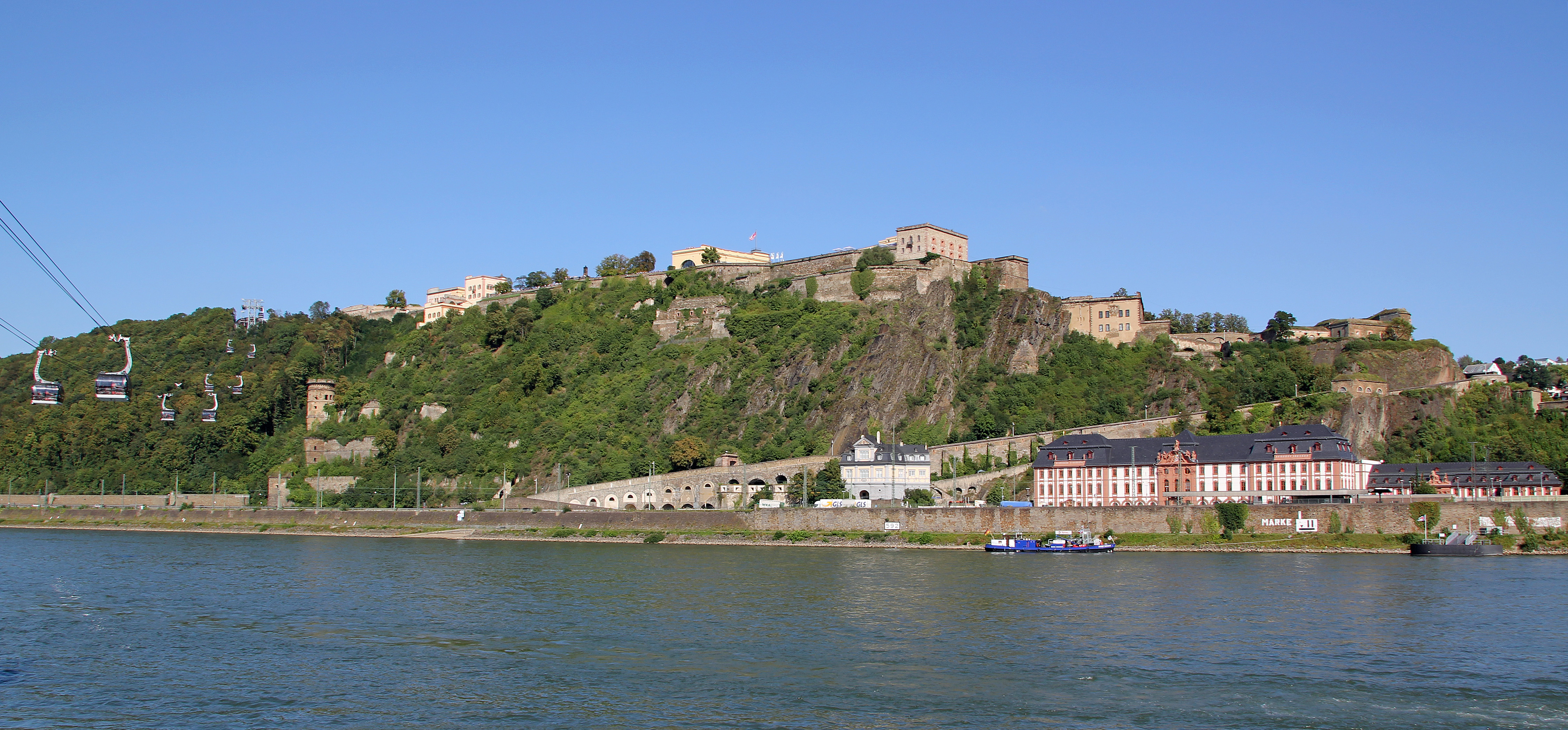
Ehrenbreitstein Fortress in Koblenz

The French included the Middle Rhine area in the department of Rhin-et-Moselle, with its seat in Koblenz. The new government replaced the German princes with French secular rulers, abolished the feudal system, seized land from the church and nobility in order to resell it and introduced French-style legislation.

On New Year's Day 1814, an army under general Blücher crossed the Rhine at Kaub. This marked the end of the French rule, the final defeat of Napoleon and the beginning of Prussian rule over the Middle Rhine. On the Congress of Vienna in 1815 Prussia received its "Watch on the Rhine" on the left bank. The right bank was held by Hesse-Nassau. Prussia secured its supremacy by the construction of the great fortress at Koblenz from 1817 onwards. After 1830, most of the changes introduced by French rulers were abolished in the Rhine Province and the old corporate state (nobility, cities, farmers) was rebuilt. The nobles resumed the political power; the educated middle class had almost no political influence outside of towns. After the Austro-Prussian War of 1866, Prussia annexed the Nassau areas on right bank.

Steamships were introduced on the Rhine from about 1830. Railway lines were constructed from 1857. Neither innovation led to industrialization in the narrow Rhine valley. As late as 1900, viticulture dominated the economic structure of the Middle Rhine, with its small cities and agriculture.

=== 20th century ===
After the end of the First World War in November 1918, the left bank of the Rhine and 50 km wide strip on the right bank were declared a "demilitarized zone". At first the Americans administered this territory, after 1923 the French. In the Rhineland, the change from a monarchy to a republic went almost unnoticed. The plan, in 1923, to build a "Rhenish Republic" failed. The French withdrew their troops again in 1929.

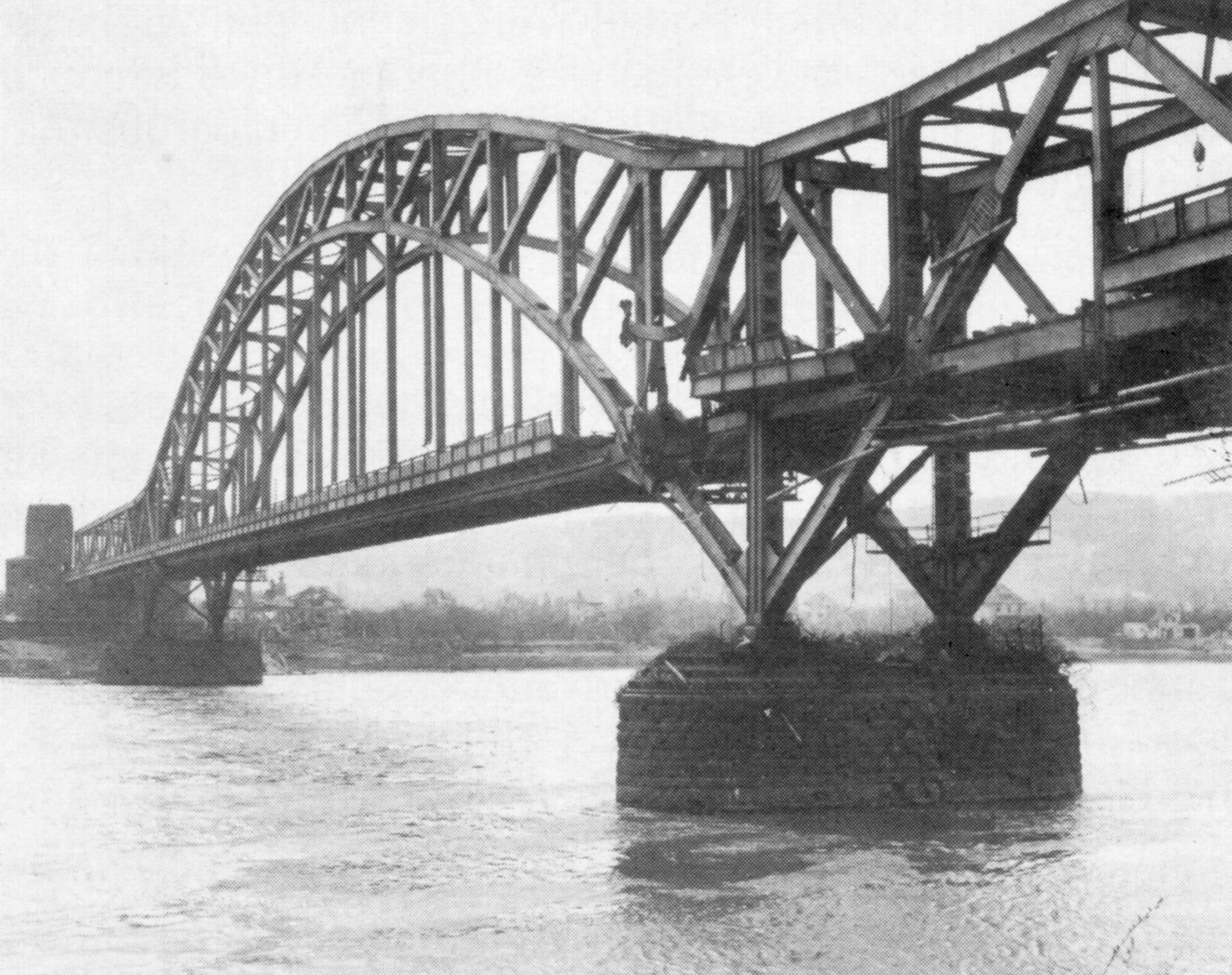
Ludendorff Bridge at Remagen, showing damage before its collapse. (March 1945)

After the appointment of Hitler as Chancellor on January 30, 1933 the enthusiasm on the Middle Rhine was great. In many places, Hitler was named an honorary citizen. Jewish and other non-Christian officials were replaced by party functionaries. The Jews, who had played a significant role in small town business were robbed and driven out, some of them murdered.

The Battle of Remagen during the Allied invasion of Germany resulted in the capture of the Ludendorff Bridge over the Rhine and shortened World War II in Europe. Damage during the battle caused the bridge's collapse on March 17, 1945, but only after the Allies had gained a foothold on the eastern side of the bridge. By March 21, Allied forces had ended the war's hostilities on the Middle Rhine. Because of the battle's outcome, Hitler ordered a court-martial that sentenced to death five officers that had been involved in defending the bridge.

The French again took up the administration of the territory in its occupation zone. At end of 1946, the Americans created the State Hesse in their occupation zone; six months later the French founded of the State of Rhineland-Palatinate. Although some areas were combined in the new states that historically do not belong together, a sense of togetherness quickly appeared. The desire for state boundaries more in line with historical territorial boundaries, however, never ceased entirely.

== UNESCO World Heritage Site "Upper Middle Rhine Valley" ==
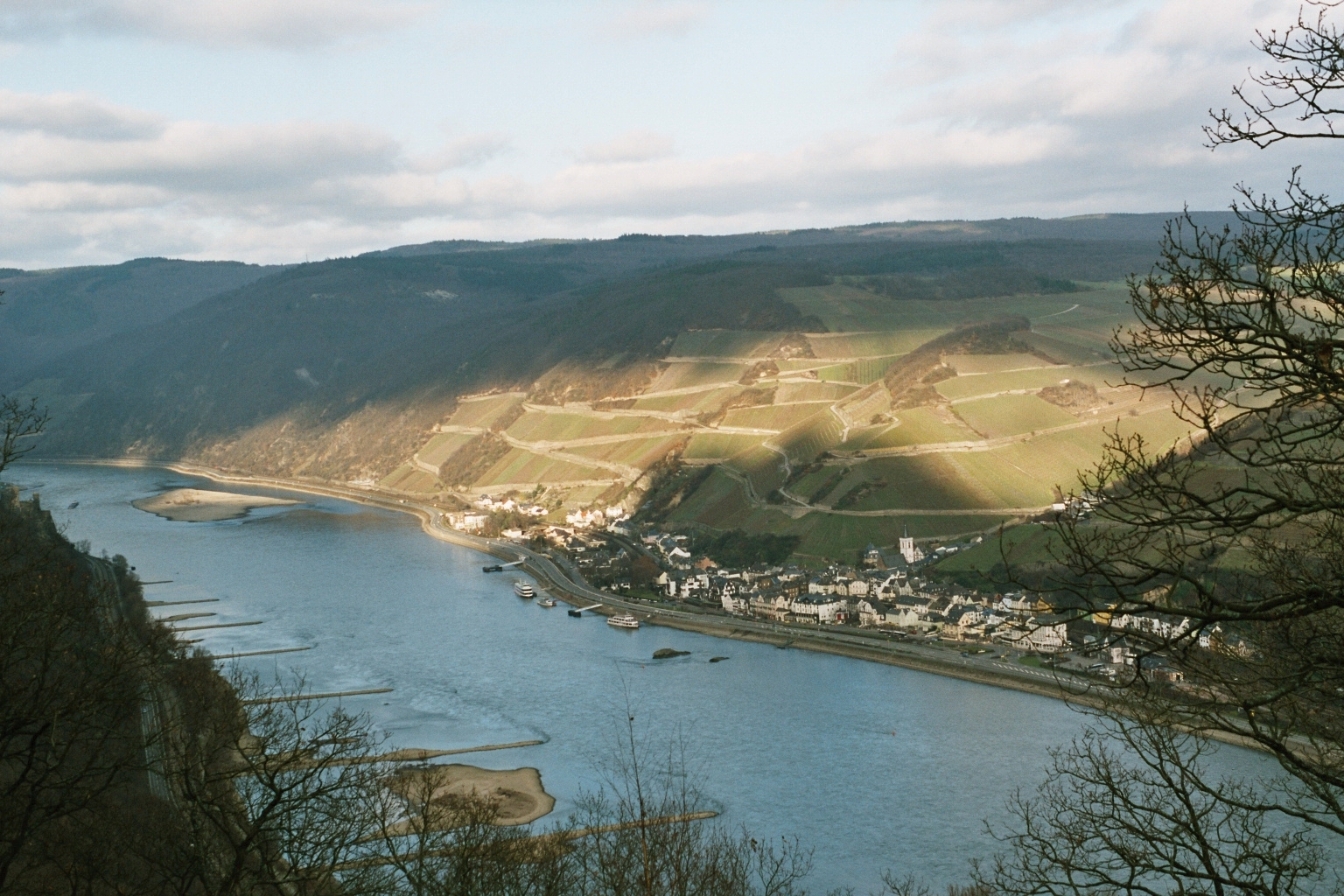
Assmannshausen, as seen from the Damianskopf

The "cultural landscape of the Upper Middle Rhine Valley" is the narrow Rhine Valley from [Bingen and Rüdesheim to Koblenz. On 27 June 2002, the UNESCO included this unique landscape in the list of the World Heritage sites.

=== Criteria for a cultural landscape ===
Recognition as a "cultural landscape" requires under the terms of the criteria an integrated landscape space that has a certain uniqueness and where humans experience an unusual configuration. In the Upper Middle Rhine Valley, the breakthrough by the Rhine through the Rhenish Slate Mountains created this configuration. The valley with its steep rocky slopes, which forced users to create terraces, which shaped the valley over the centuries. It was particularly influenced by the vineyards on terraces (since the 8th century), shale mining and coppicing. Agriculture was possible only on the plateaus. The valley is unique in its variety of over 40 castles along only 65 kilometres (40 mi) of the stream. The Upper Middle Rhine Valley is the epitome of the Romantic Rhine landscape and also a traditional transport axis (important shipping lane, two highways and two railway lines).

=== Transport planning ===
When the world cultural heritage status was granted, UNESCO pointed out that the noise generated by traffic (in particular, the railway lines) is a problem. Concrete measures but were neither recommended nor required. Nevertheless, the Rudesheim section was scheduled to be routed through a tunnel (construction began in 2011).

The Rhineland-Palatinate state government plans to construct a new Middle Rhine Bridge near St. Goar and St. Goarshausen. This should be coordinated with UNESCO. On 29 July 2010, UNESCO announced in this regard that before further planning of a bridge, a master plan is to be presented to demonstrate the need for new bridge and compatibility with World Heritage status. Only further consultations can reveal whether problems similar to those in the former World Heritage Site Dresden Elbe Valley can be avoided. Various explanations by the state government notwithstanding, reports that consent of UNESCO had been granted after discussions is Brasília, turned out to be premature. According to the UNESCO commission, a decision could be reached in the summer of 2011 at the earliest.

The Rhine Cable Car that was constructed for the Federal Garden Show 2011 in Koblenz also posed a threat to world heritage status. For this reason, the garden show organisers agreed with UNESCO on an inconspicuous design of the cable car structures and the demolition of the cable car after three years.

== Castles ==
With a few exceptions, the castles in the Middle Rhine Valley were constructed between the 12th century and the first half of the 14th century. They were usually built on the middle terraces that were created during the formation of the valley. In the 10th and 11th century, castle building had been a privilege of the king and high nobility. Structures from this period were usually made of wood or rammed earth and have not survived.

The weakening of imperial power began in the 12th century and the power of the Princes grew.

Between 1220 and 1231, several important rights (regalia) were transferred to the spiritual (Confoederatio cum principibus ecclesiasticis) and temporal (Statutum in favorem principum) princes of the empire. From 1273, the Emperor was elected by the Electors; in 1356 imperial fiefs became territorial states. This was also the period when most castles were constructed. Four of the seven Electors held territories in the Middle Rhine Valley. The political landscape was a patchwork, as the parts of these territories were not connected. initially, the castles served to secure territory. In the late 12th century, the princes discovered customs revenue as a source of income and some castles were built to control customs. Castles were also built outside cities to keep the aspirations to freedom of the city dwellers in check.

By the end of the 14th century, firearms were introduced in the area. Structural responses were needed, which only wealthy castle owners could afford. Many castles lost their strategic importance to firearms in this period. Most castles declined slowly or were abandoned. In the Thirty Years' War, many castles were destroyed by passing troops. The final destruction of almost all castles was brought about by Louis XIV's troops during the War of the Palatine Succession. Only the high castles Festung Ehrenbreitstein, Marksburg and Burg Rheinfels were spared.

With the advent of Rhine romanticism after 1815, many castles were rebuilt.

== Viticulture ==
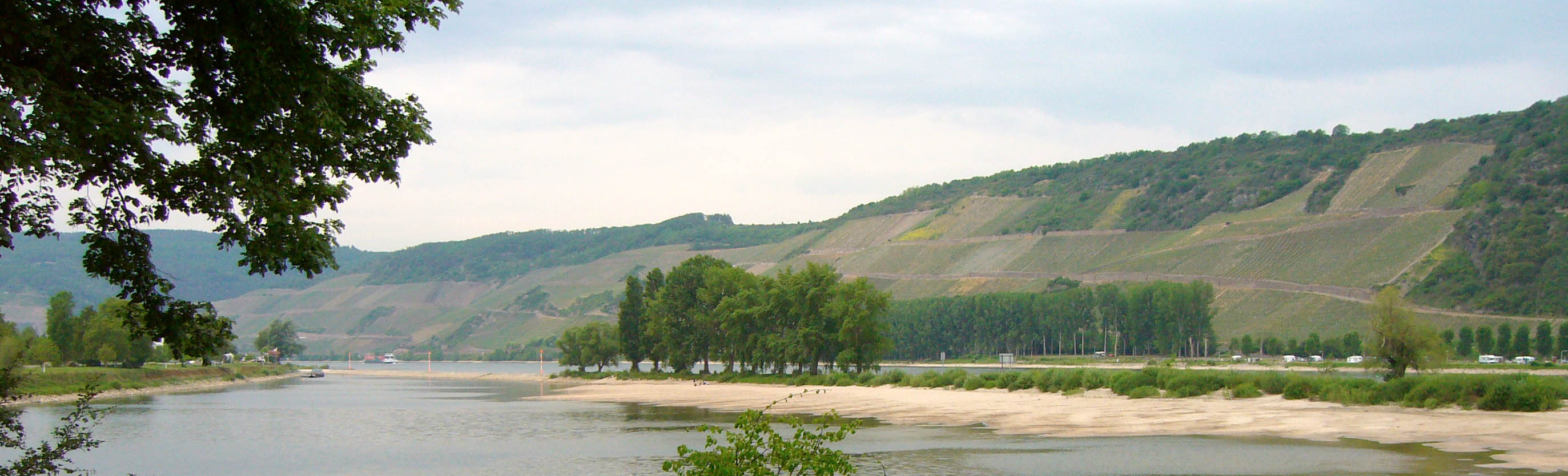
Vineyards at Bopparder Hamm

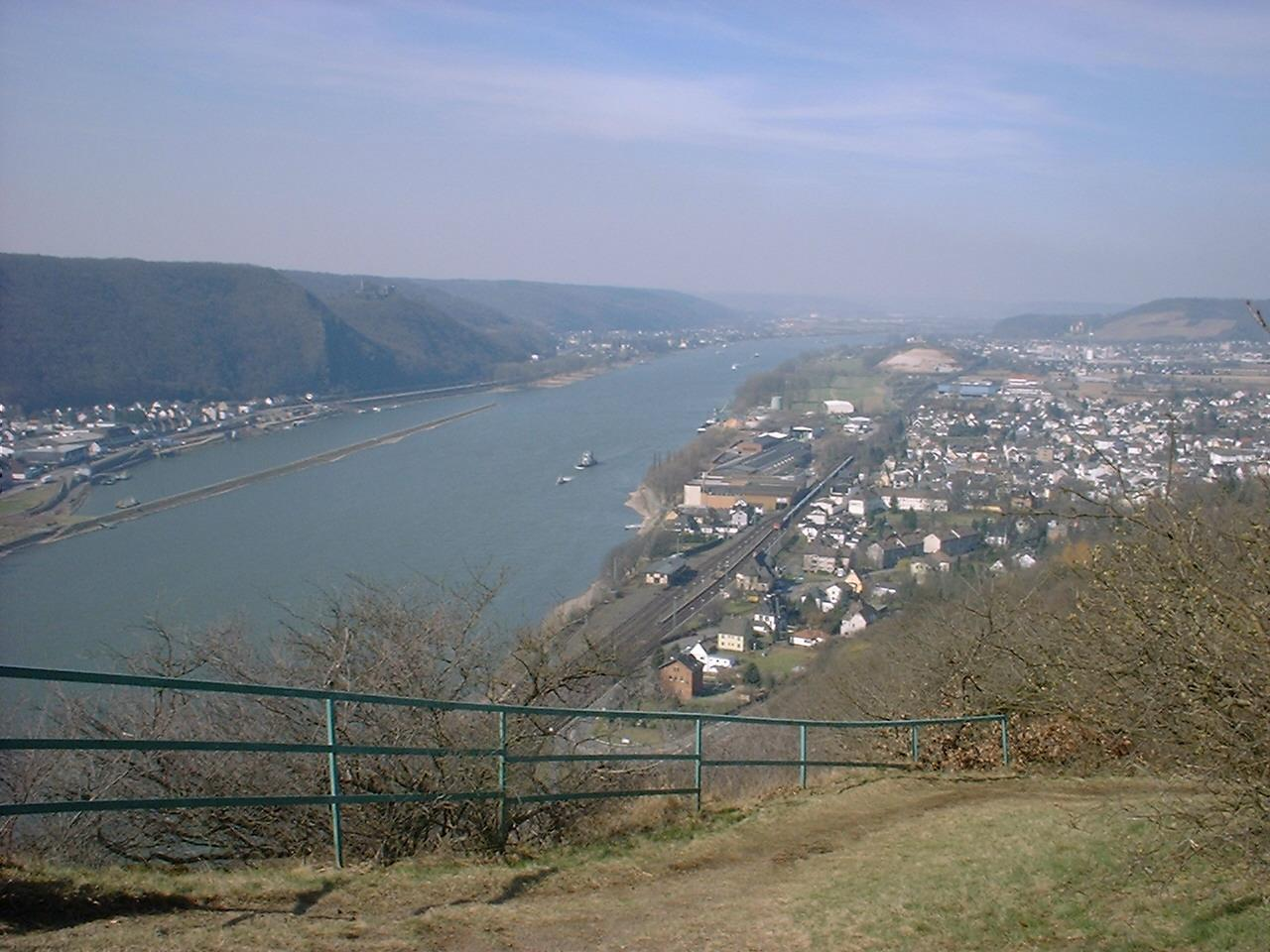
Vineyards and Middle Rhine, view from Rheinbrohler Ley

The Middle Rhine geographical region is largely identical to the geographical region to the Middle Rhine wine region, as defined by the German wine law as a specified area for quality wine.

The Romans introduced viticulture into the Region. That is, they introduced it into the Moselle valley; it spread into the Middle Rhine Valley during the Middle Ages. This development took place in four phases from the 11th to the end of the 14th century. An essential element of this development was the new technique of terrace viticulture. Vines are grown on terraces sloping from 25° to 30° and more.

The climate favours wine production, as both the Rhine and the slate and greywacke weathered soils function as a heat storage that helps prevent large temperature fluctuations. Additionally, the steep slopes function to drain cold air from the valley. This is particularly beneficial for the late-ripening Riesling, which as of 2010 was grown on about 68% of the total area under viticulture. The terraced vineyards used to be much smaller. The current situation has emerged only after a land consolidation in the 1960s. Unfortunately, with the disappearance of the old stone walls, a valuable habitat for microorganisms was lost. Some old style terraces are still in use in the Middle Rhine Valley. They continue to use the old technique of binding each vine to a separate pole.

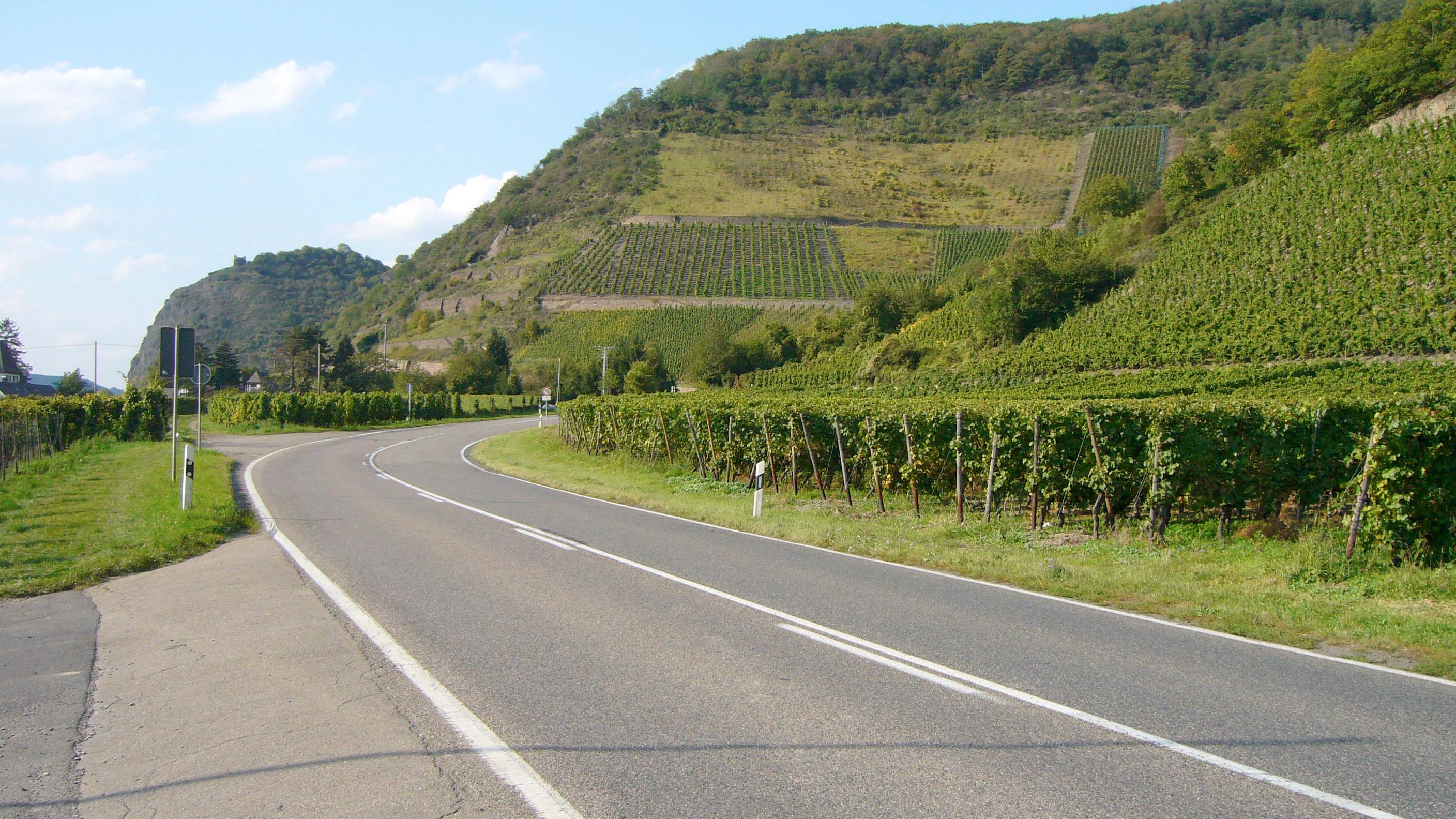
Vineyards near Leutesdorf with the ruins of Hammerstein castle

In the Middle Ages, wine was the only non-germinated storable drink for the common people, as beer was often expensive and of poor quality, water in urban areas was usually polluted and coffee and tea were still unknown. A regional speciality of the four valleys around Bacharach is Feuerwein, a specially treated wine that was traded far to the North. It now again being manufactured at Posthof in Bacharach. It was one of the dominant items of trade in the Middle Ages, fostered by the Rhine as the most important waterway, and existing Roman roads. It was valued by landlords, as growing wine appreciated the value of their land. The legal, social and economic situation of the workers improved as more and more workers with critical skills were needed. In the late Middle Ages, the economy flourished and the majority of the population was dependent on wine growing. After the dissolution of many Lordships, land ownership fragmented and the land was divided into many small parcels.

By the end of the 16th century this industry was booming. The Thirty Years' War then caused recession and decline. Prices of beer, tea and coffee dropped, causing profit margins on wine to shrink. After 1815, the left bank was Prussian and the economic situation improved. The 1839 German customs union led to strong competition. Many farmers found themselves a day job, and grew wine as a secondary occupation. New sources of income were the sparkling wine industry and wine bars serving tourists attracted by the Rhine romanticism. After 1870 the railways brought new problems: cheaper and better foreign competition and the advent of vine insects of America and France (powdery mildew, phylloxera, downy mildew and vine moth). The deeper cause of the decline were the changed socio-economic conditions. Until the 19th century, there were few other opportunities for paid employment in the Rhine Valley, so many workers migrated to areas where the emerging manufacturing industries were creating new employment opportunities. The economic situation on the left bank improved after the Second World War. Until then, the only industries on the left bank were viticulture and tourism. In the 1960s, 92% of the slopes was consolidated into larger vineyards. Nevertheless, the wine industry declined further, due to lack of profits. In 1950 the Mittelrhein region boasted 1,448 hectares (3,580 acres) of vines under cultivation. In 1989 it had fallen by 53% to 681 hectares (1,680 acres), and from 1989 to 2009 the total area of viticulture in the Middle Rhine region shrunk by a further 19% to 438 hectares (1,080 acres).

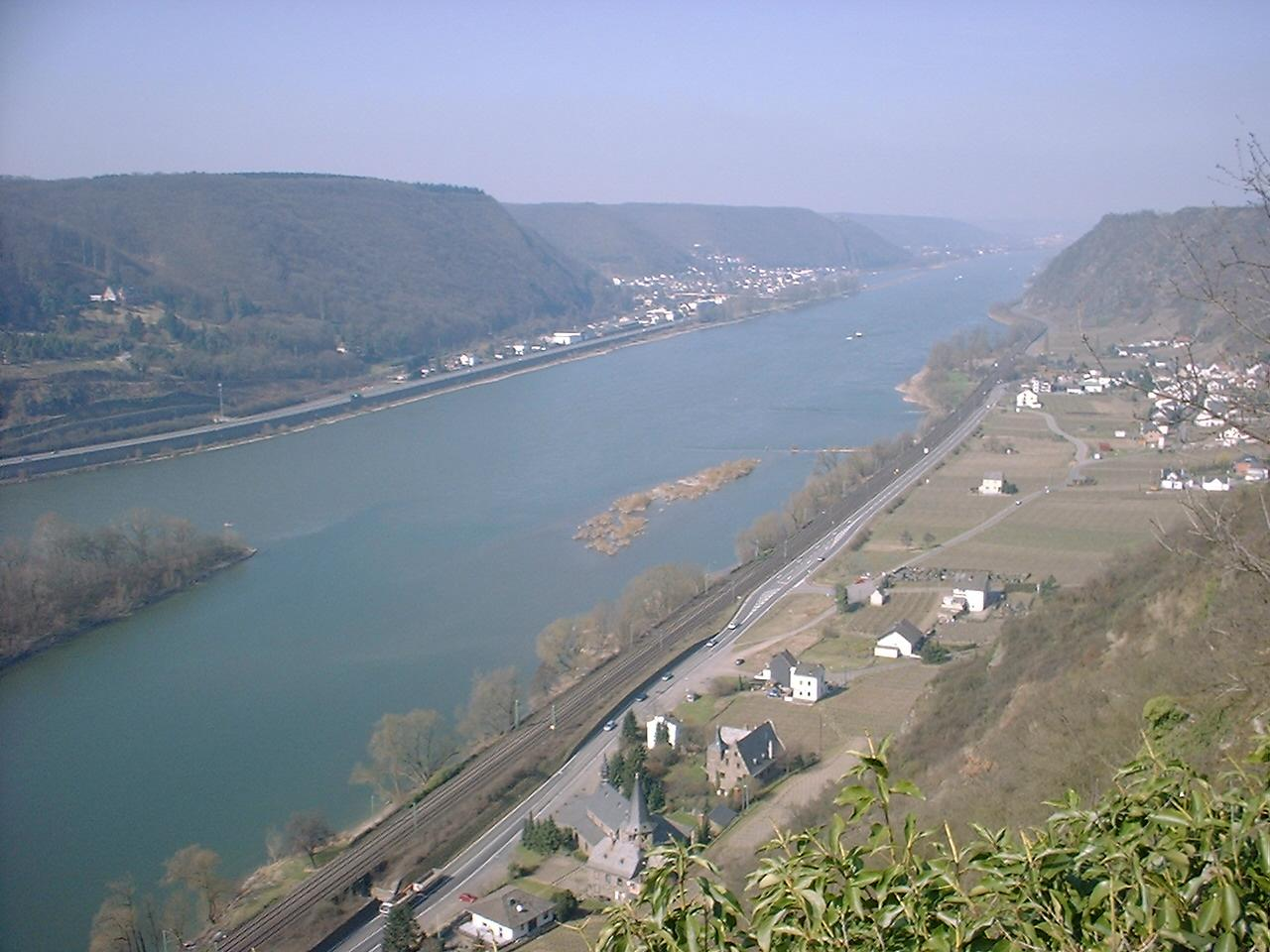
Vineyards and Middel Rhine; view from Hammerstein castle

About 58% of the vineyard area that existed in 1900 has since become a wasteland; another 16% lies fallow 40 to 80% of the time. Some 480 hectares (1,200 acres) remains and the trend is decreasing: in 2006, only 380 hectares (940 acres) of that 480 hectares was actually used to grow grapes. The wastelands are overgrown with bushes and, over time, they revert to being forests. This is a big problem. If we want to retain the character of the landscape, we will have to find new uses for the terraces, or at least maintain them and keep them open. The Land consolidation program at the Oelsberg in Oberwesel provides a successful example of preserving the terraces without major movement of dirt. By creating transverse terraces and construction of a drip irrigation system, the characteristic small parcels could be retained for the viticulture industry. At Bacharach, a smooth transformation to facilitate the maintenance of the trellis is in the planning stage. Particularly distinctive landmarks, such as the single layers at Roßstein opposite Oberwesel, or below Stahleck Castle at Bacharach, or around Gutenfels Castle at Kaub deserve the continuation of the industry to maintain the appeal of the cultural landscape. At the foot of many of the Middle Rhine Valley castles, we now find derelict vineyards and scrubland. Reintroducing viticulture would restore the much sought-after picture postcard idyll, in which the light and fine-grained green and rich yellow (in the autumn) of the terraced vineyards, with their small parcels, contrasts nicely with the darker green of the forest. Despite parcel consolidation, use of mechanization is limited, as most vineyards are too steep to allow access using wheeled tractors or grape harvesters. This means, all labour is still done manually. Consequently, the only profitable vineyards are the ones selling their own bottled wine, and even they need the extra income from renting out apartments or restaurants or even an ostrich farm. By today, there are only 109 commercial wineries left of the 455 counted in 1999.

== Tourism ==
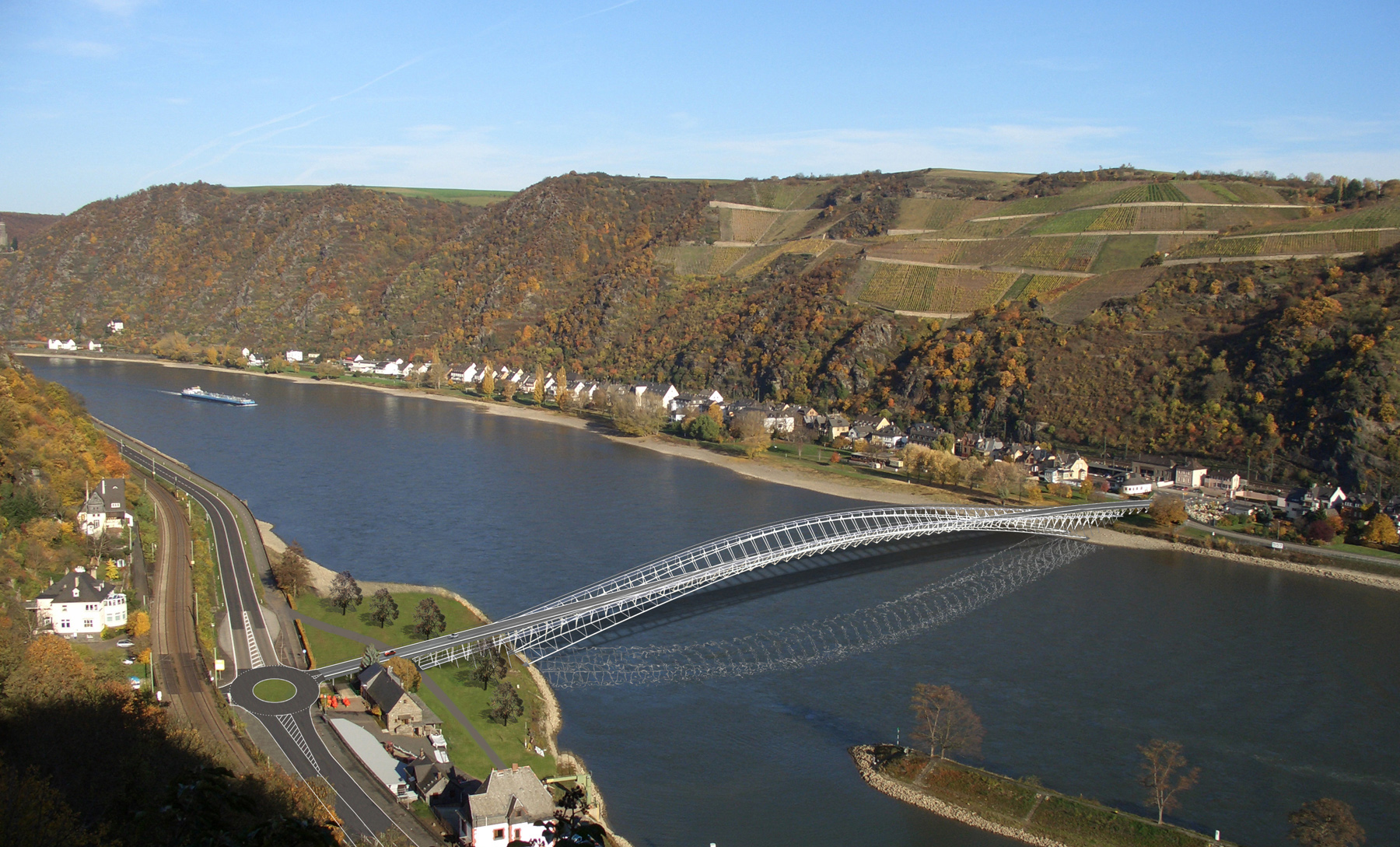
Photo montage of the proposed Middle Rhine Bridge

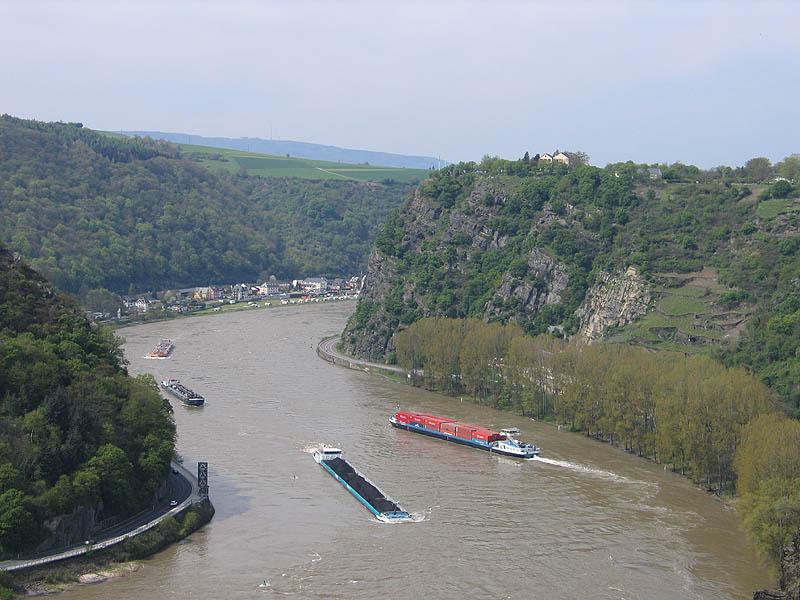
Signal Station on a special hazard area near the Loreley

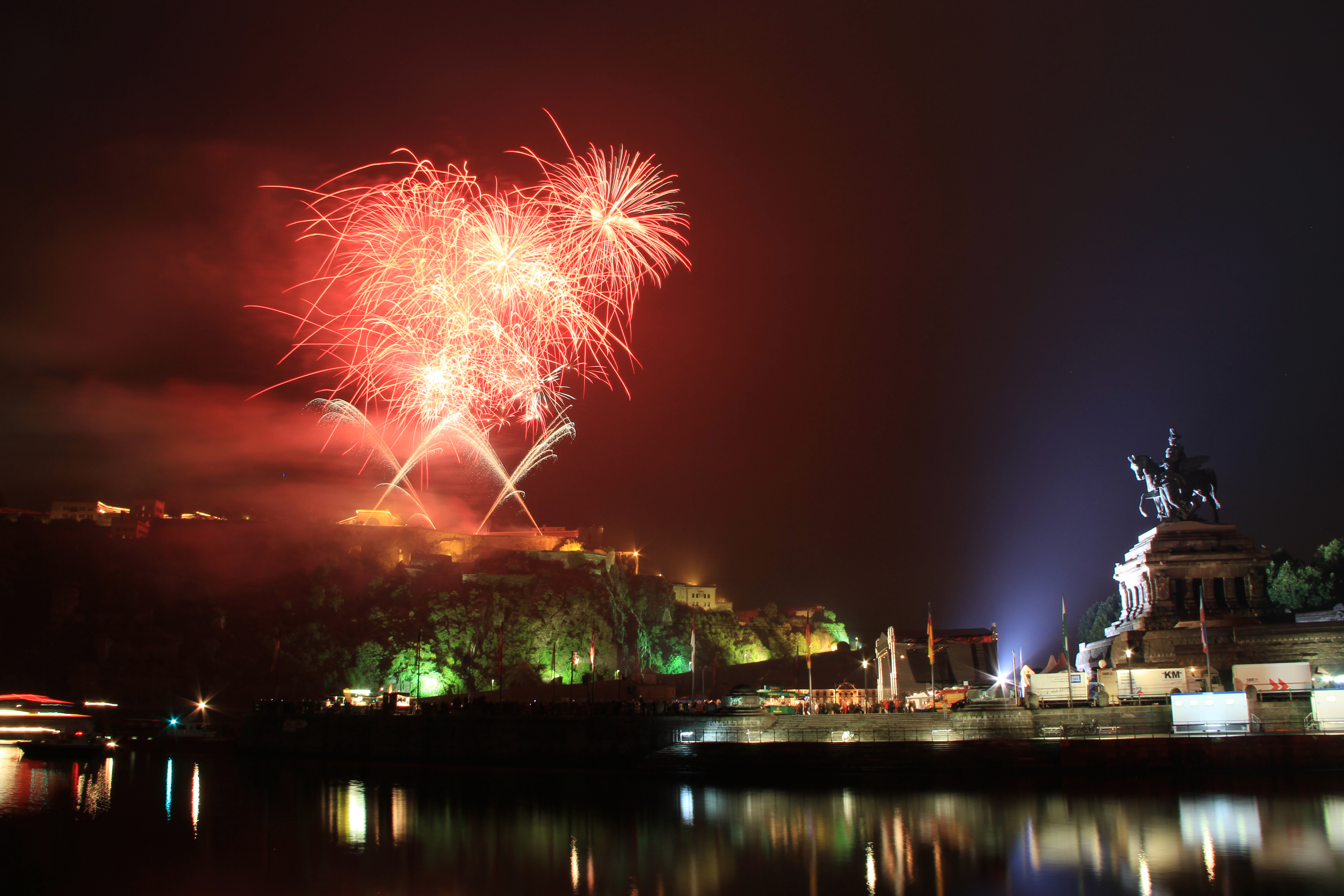
Rhein in Flammen on the Fortress Ehrenbreitstein in Koblenz

Young British aristocrats on their Grand Tour to Italy discovered the Middle Rhine in the 18th century. With the German romance of the Middle Rhine in Germany was also a dream destination. Tourism, which had been induced by the Rhine romanticism, in turn promoted, which was provided by the Köln-Düsseldorfer company, which was founded in 1827, and the construction of the West Rhine Railway between the 1840s and 1870s. This brought a new economic boom to the Middle Rhine area, which continued well into the 20th century. The only paddle steamer still remaining on the Rhine is the Goethe, running between Koblenz and Rudesheim.

German and foreign tourists never quite lost interest in the Middle Rhine. Interest, however, decreased noticeably since the 1980s. In an attempt to make the Middle Rhine more attractive in the 21st century, two new long-distance trails, the Rheinsteig on the right side of the Rhine and the Rheinburgenweg Trail on both sides of the Rhine, were opened which allow a particularly intense experience of the cultural landscape. Cyclists can ride the entire Middle Rhine Valley between Bingen and Bonn on the Rhine Cycle Route. On the left bank, this provides a continuous bike path along the river, separate from any roads accessible to cars. On the right bank, there are still some small gaps where cyclists have to use regular streets.

== Navigation ==
The Rhine is one of the busiest waterways in the world. The Middle Rhine Valley is the gap in the Rhenish Slate Mountains and forms a bottleneck due to its tight curves and shallows. To improve the safety of shipping, the Middle Rhine Warning System was created which uses light signals to guide ships through the dangerous passages.

== Events ==
- Rhine in Flames Great Fireworks in several cities in the Valley, in May, July, August and September
- Culinary summer night in August in Bacharach, Beginner Wine Festival, and in October in Posthof Bacharach
- Middle Rhine Marathon from Oberwesel to the German Corner in Koblenz
- Tal Total on the last Sunday in June, car-free valley between Bingen/Rüdesheim and Koblenz/Lahnstein
- Rhine on Skates, last Saturday in August, guided inline skating tour from Rüdesheim via Lorch (crossing Rhine by ferry), Koblenz and Lahnstein back to Rüdesheim, a distance of 135 kilometres (84 mi), with about 1,000 participants (2012)

== See also ==
- Rhine
- Rhine Gorge
- Rhineland
- Mittelrhein (wine region)
- Upper Rhine
- Lower Rhine
- Köln-Düsseldorfer
- List of rivers of Germany
