= Burg Sterrenberg =

Burg Sterrenberg is the name of a number of castles:

- Burg Sterrenberg (Pfalz), Otterbach, Landkreis Kaiserslautern
- Burg Sterrenberg (Rhein), Kamp-Bornhofen, Rhein-Lahn
