= Fort Constantine =

Fort Constantine, Fort Konstantin, Fort Constantin, or Fort Grand Duke Constantine may refer to:

- Fort Konstantin (Germany), Koblenz, Germany
- Fort Constantin (Russia), Kronstadt, Russia
- Konstantin Battery or Fort Constantine, built in Sevastopol, Ukraine in 1840
- Fort Constantine (Yukon) near Forty Mile, Yukon
- Fort Constantine, Canadian ship of the Fort ship type
- RFA Fort Constantine, a Royal Fleet Auxiliary ship
