= Henry, Holy Roman Emperor =

Henry, Holy Roman Emperor may refer to:

- Henry the Fowler (876 – 936), duke of Saxony from 912 and king of the Germans from 919 until his death
- Henry II, Holy Roman Emperor (973 – 1024), the Holy or the Saint, 5th and last Holy Roman Emperor of the Ottonian dynasty; King of Germany and King of Italy
- Henry III, Holy Roman Emperor (1017–1056), the Black or the Pious, member of the Salian Dynasty of Holy Roman Emperors
- Henry IV, Holy Roman Emperor (1050–1106), King of Germany and Holy Roman Emperor
- Henry V, Holy Roman Emperor (1086–1125), King of Germany and Holy Roman Emperor; fourth and last ruler of the Salian dynasty
- Henry VI, Holy Roman Emperor (1165–1197), King of Germany, Holy Roman Emperor and King of Sicily
- Henry (VII) of Germany (1211–1242), King of Sicily, King of Germany and Duke of Swabia
- Henry VII, Holy Roman Emperor, Holy Roman Emperor
