= Koblenz Charterhouse =

Carthusian monastery in Germany

Coordinates: 50°21′2″N 7°35′11″E

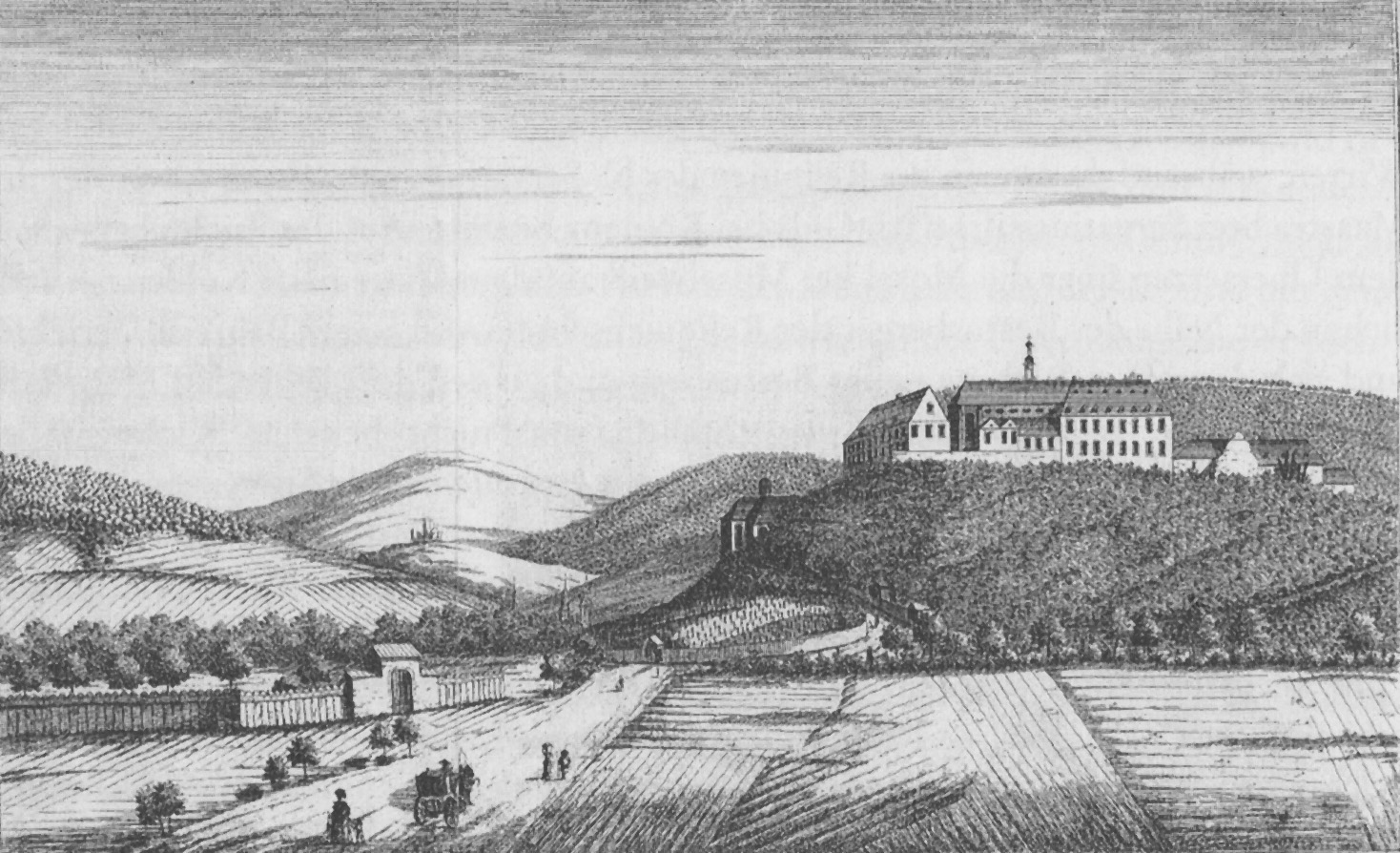
Koblenz Charterhouse on the Beatusberg, 1789 (copperplate engraving by C Dupuis)

Koblenz Charterhouse (German: Kartause Koblenz) was a Carthusian monastery, or charterhouse, in Koblenz, Rhineland-Palatinate, Germany. It stood on the Beatusberg, a hill that forms the north-easterly tip of the Hunsrück overlooking the city. The site was first occupied by a Benedictine monastery, the Kloster St. Beatusberg, which was closed in 1315, when the monks were replaced by a community of Augustinian Canons until the Carthusians took over the site in 1331.

The charterhouse was damaged in the Thirty Years' War and still more in the Siege of Koblenz in 1688 during the Nine Years' War, and was largely rebuilt in the 1720s and 1730s. It was dissolved in the secularisation under Napoleon in 1802, the monks having been expelled from the premises in 1794. The buildings were put to military use and then demolished for the construction of the Prussian Fort Grossfürst Konstantin in 1822–32.

The former charterhouse - German: Kartause - has given its name to the modern district of Karthause, which contains not only the fort but also a prison, a secondary school and the state archives.
