= Henry (VII) of Germany =

Heir apparent of Emperor Frederick II (1211–1242)

Henry (VII)
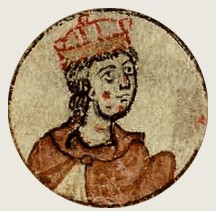
- Depiction in the Chronica regia Coloniensis, 13th century

King of Germany (formally King of the Romans)
- Reign: 1222–1235
- Coronation: 8 May 1222 (Aachen)
- Predecessor: Frederick II
- Successor: Conrad IV

King of Sicily
- Reign: 1212–1217
- Predecessor: Frederick II
- Successor: Frederick II
- Regent: Constance of Aragon

King of Italy
- Reign: 1217–1217
- Predecessor: Frederick II
- Successor: Conrad IV
- Born: 1211; Kingdom of Sicily (Present-day Italy)
- Died: 12 February 1242 (aged 30–31); Martirano, Calabria, Kingdom of Sicily
- Burial: Cosenza, Calabria, Kingdom of Sicily
- Spouse: Margaret of Austria (m. 1225)
- House: House of Hohenstaufen
- Father: Frederick II, Holy Roman Emperor
- Mother: Constance of Aragon

Henry (VII) (1211 – 12 February 1242), a member of the Hohenstaufen dynasty, was King of Sicily from 1212 until 1217 and King of Germany (formally King of the Romans) from 1222 until 1235, as son and king, co-ruler of Emperor Frederick II. He was the seventh Henry to rule Germany, but in order to avoid confusion with the Luxembourg emperor Henry VII, he is usually numbered Henry (VII).

== Under custody ==
Henry was born in Sicily, the only son of King Frederick II and his first wife, Constance of Aragon. He was the elder brother of Conrad IV, who eventually succeeded him as king.

While Frederick sought to be elected German king against his Welf rival Otto IV, he had his new-born son crowned King of Sicily (as Henry II) by Pope Innocent III in March 1212, since an agreement between Frederick and the Pope stated that the kingdoms of Germany and Sicily should not be united under one ruler. For this, the regency of the Sicilian kingdom went to his mother Constance and not to his father.

However, after the death of the Pope in 1216, Frederick called his son to Germany, entrusted him with the Duchy of Swabia, and again assumed the title of King of Sicily in 1217. Henry's mother remained as regent in Sicily, now on behalf of her husband, until 1220. After the extinction of the Swabian Zähringen line in 1219 Henry also received their title of a Rector of Burgundy, though that title disappeared when Henry was elected king.

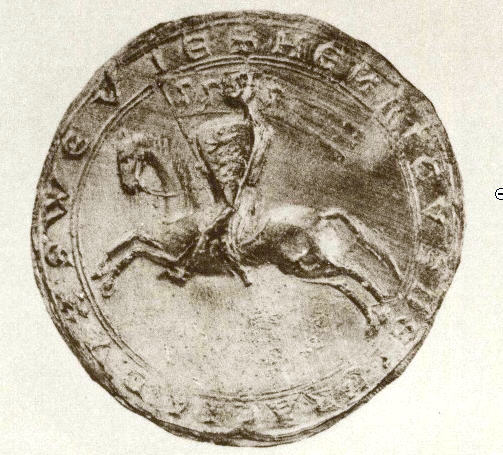
Henry's seal (dated 1216) shows him as a mounted knight with a shield and banner displaying three leopards (three lions passant guardant [or reguardant]) as the Hohenstaufen coat of arms; the three lions (later shown just passant) would later become known as the Swabian coat of arms.

On 20/26 April 1220, the German princes assembled at Frankfurt elected Henry King of the Romans, for which the Emperor issued Confoederatio cum principibus ecclesiasticis, favoring the prince-bishops. "The chief Princes present at Frankfort were the Archbishops of Mayence, Cologne, Treves, and Magdeburg, several Bishops, the Dukes of Bavaria and Brabant, the Landgrave of Thuringia, the Margraves of Namur and Baden, the Counts of Holland and Cleves, and the officials of Frederick's court." The election had been a condition to Frederick II redeeming his Crusade promises of 1215, because the succession question, in case of the emperor's death on the crusade, was clarified by them. However, Pope Honorius III did not recognize the election and also deprived Henry of his rights over the Sicilian kingdom, because he (just as his predecessor) wanted to prevent the union of both countries. Also, numerous German princes had rejected the election in the first moment.

After Frederick II returned to Italy in 1220, Henry was placed under the tutelage of Archbishop Engelbert I of Cologne, who crowned him German king on 8 May 1222, in Aachen. Despite the fact that Henry was formally betrothed to the Přemyslid princess Agnes of Bohemia, daughter of King Ottokar I of Bohemia, Engelbert planned his marriage with Isabella of England, one of the daughters of King John Lackland; however, this union never took place. After Engelbert's death in 1225, Duke Louis I of Bavaria took over the guardianship. The young King was mostly in the care of imperial ministeriales, like Conrad of Winterstetten. They also acted as administrators over his Swabian duchy. In the meanwhile, the betrothal between Henry and the Bohemian princess was cancelled.

In Nürnberg on 29 November 1225, by order of his father, Henry married Margaret of Babenberg, daughter of Duke Leopold VI of Austria, a woman seven years older than he was. Sixteen months later, on 23 March 1227, she was crowned German queen in Aachen. The marriage produced two sons, Henry and Frederick, who both died at a young age.

Henry seems to have been a lively, cultured ruler and kept many Minnesänger at his court. It is possible he wrote some Minnelieder (courtly love poetry) himself. He was physically robust, although lame, and about 1.66 m (5' 4½") tall.

== Majority and rebellion against his father ==
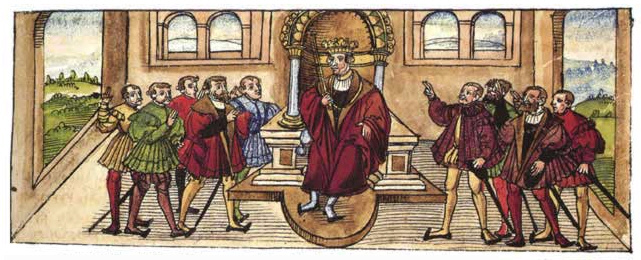
King Henry receives homage in Würzburg in 1234, from the 16th-century Bishop's Chronicle by Lorenz Fries

In 1228, he had a falling-out with Duke Louis of Bavaria, who was suspected of plotting with Pope Gregory IX against Emperor Frederick II. Around Christmas of that year, Henry took over the rule for himself, forced Louis to submit, and then turned against the Bishop of Straßburg. The German princes, angered by his city-friendly policies, forced him however to issue in Worms on 1 May 1231 the Statutum in favorem principum, directed against the cities, and by their complaints turned Frederick II against his son. The emperor was dependent on the support of the princes for his Italian policies against the Pope. Among other things which augmented the discord between father and son, Frederick lifted several regulations Henry had stipulated during his minority years to reduce his authority, and on the other side, the elevation of the Swabian count Egeno V of Urach, a staunch enemy of the Emperor, who became the most important of Henry's advisers.

In 1232, Frederick came to terms with Pope Gregory, confirmed the Statutum, and had Henry swear obedience in Cividale. In the same year, Henry renewed the league between the Hohenstaufen and the French royal Capetian dynasty. In the following year he entered into a conflict with the House of Wittelsbach and subdued Otto II of the Palatinate, the son of Duke Louis of Bavaria. Frederick, fearing the discontent of the German princes, demanded the release of all hostages. In 1233/34, however, Henry made his father angry again, when he intervened against some inquisition measures, especially the Archbishop of Bremen's crusade against rebellious peasants of Stedingen. Pope Gregory IX, who had authorised the crusade, excommunicated Henry. Emperor Frederick outlawed his son on 5 July 1234 and announced his return to Germany.

Henry revolted and in September formed an alliance with several German bishops and Swabian nobles. However, further negotiations with King Louis IX of France and the Lombard League failed. The princes adopted a wait-and-see stance, while Henry's forces were stuck in fights with the Lords of Hohenlohe, Margrave Herman V of Baden, and the City of Worms. Emperor Frederick, once he had entered Germany, soon gained a large following. When both sides met in Swabia, Henry was forced to submit to his father on 2 July 1235 at Wimpfen Castle, forsaken by most of his followers. Frederick II and the princes tried Henry on 4 July 1235 in Worms and dethroned him. His sons were deprived of the succession jointly with him. Henry's younger brother Conrad was appointed Duke of Swabia instead and also elected King of the Romans.

Henry's allies were mostly pardoned. Frederick II reacted to the weakening of the royal power originated by his dispute with his son, among other things, with the diet in Mainz on 25 August 1235, which for first time passed a law on the public peace (German: Landfriedensgesetz) and fundamentally reformed the Regalia.

== Coat of arms in manuscript ==
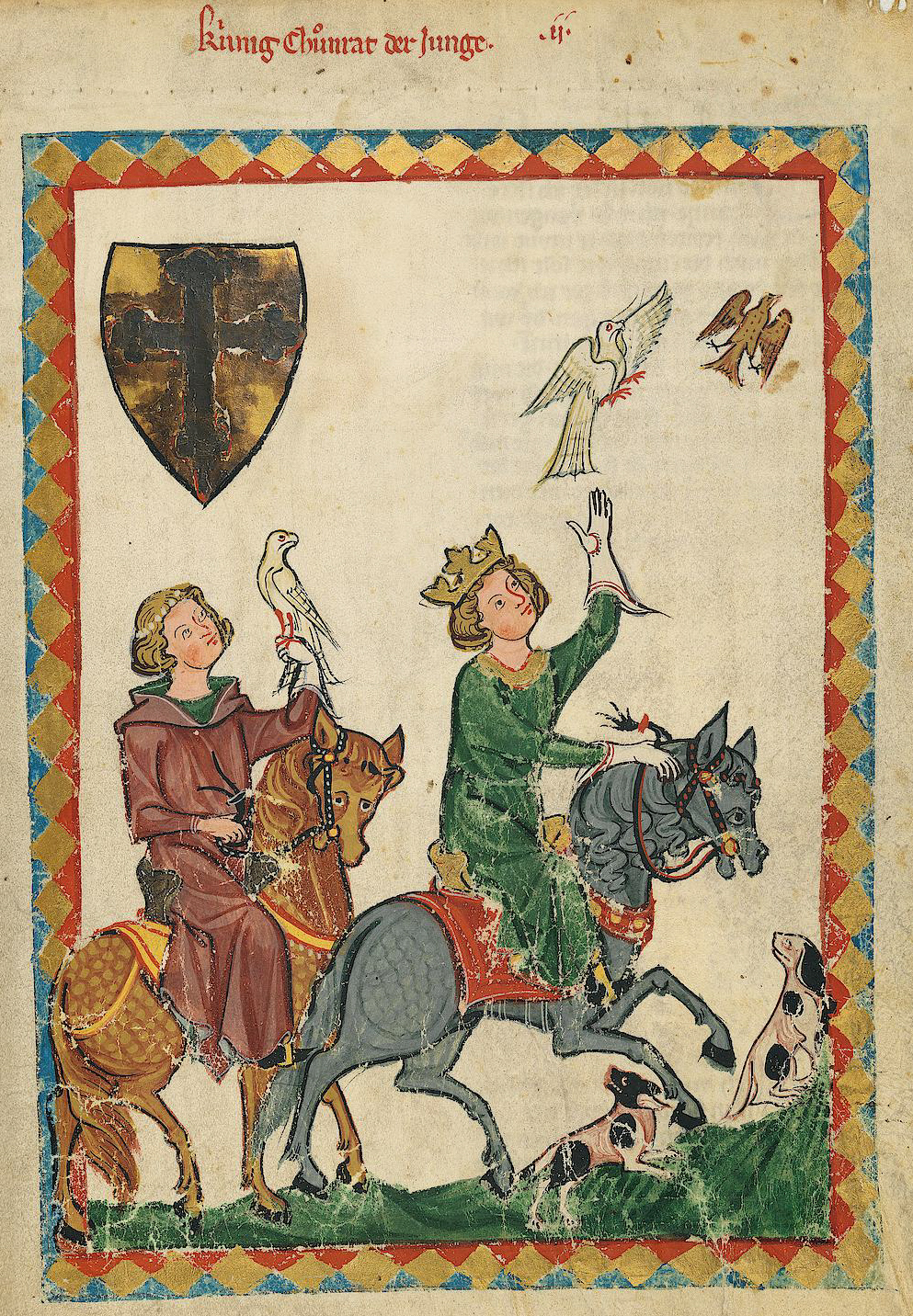
Henry (VII) following Conrad IV [the image is of Conradin, his son]

'The British Library's manuscript Royal MS 14 C VII is the only complete copy of the Historia Anglorum, a history of England covering the years 1070–1253, probably composed and written by Matthew Paris in the period between 1250–1255, and also includes Part III of the Chronica Maiora by Matthew Paris, covering the years 1254–1259. The manuscript includes numerous shields with coats of arms upright or inverted, indicating births, coronations, or deaths of kings, nobles, clerics, and knights.'

In this manuscript, Conrad's shield with the coat of arms, at death, is a double headed eagle and in chief a red point within a part of, what it looks like, the moon.

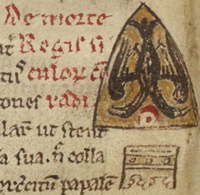
Coat of arms Conrad at death

Henry VII's halfbrother Conrad was crowned in his place and therefore the eagle with cross, is assumed to be the shield, with coat of arms, of or for Henry VII who is supporting Conrad IV; the shield hanging above Henry's head while riding a horse following Conrad IV.

On the original Codex Manesse the picture shows: the eagle faded out and 'overwritten' with a cross may resamble the time of an enforced abdication of Henry VII by his father Frederick II. There is a book that survived to this day about the art of hunting with birds "De arte venandi cum avibus", appreciated by connaisseurs for its scientific content, and therefore very close to the original user of the coat of arms.

The Kingdom of Aragón has a similar cross, pointed at the bottom. Henry VII's mother was the daughter of the King of Aragón. At Lescun with Pic d’Ansabère (Pyrenees Aragón/France) in the background you may discover a similar cross.

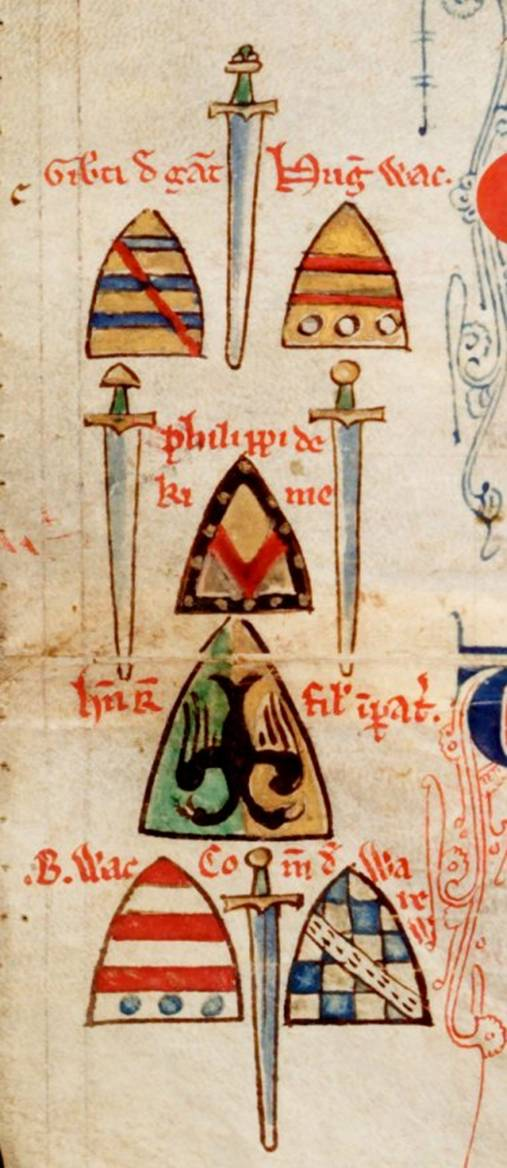
Coat of arms Henry VII at death. Right under: '134v Death of Earl Thomas of Warwick Checky azyre and Or, a bend ermine'

== Imprisonment and death ==
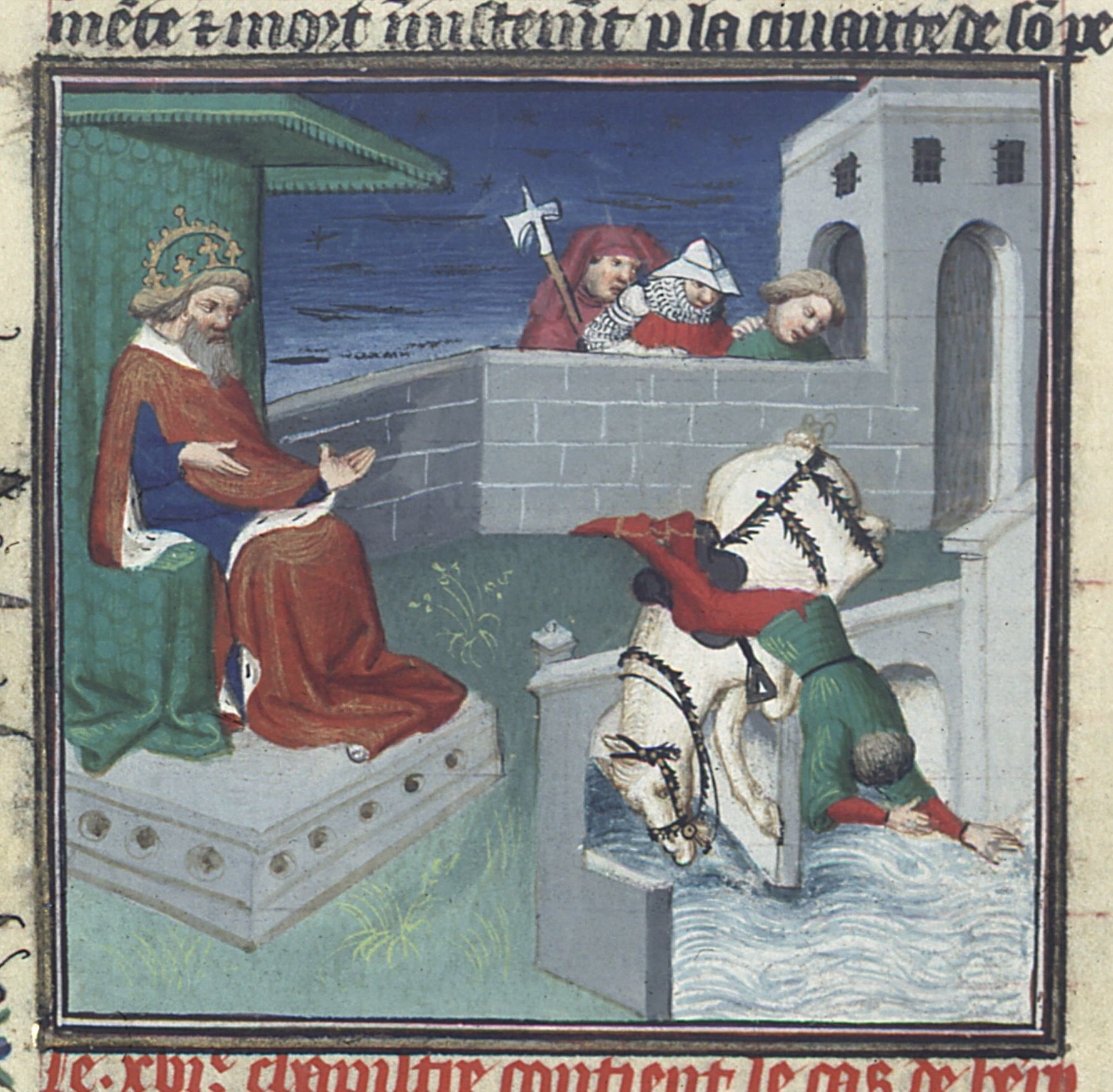
Henry's death, 15th century depiction

Henry was kept prisoner in various places, first in Heidelberg and Alerheim Castle, later in Apulia and at Rocca San Felice in Campania. His seclusion may have been dictated as much by his health as by his rebelliousness: analysis of his skeleton in 1998–1999 has shown that he was suffering from advanced leprosy in his last years. This was perhaps the real cause which prevented the emperor from forgiving him.

Possibly on 12 February (according to other sources 10 February) 1242 Henry died near Martirano in Calabria after a fall from his horse when he was moved there from Nicastro. Some chroniclers report that it had been an attempted suicide. His father had him buried with royal honours in the cathedral of Cosenza, in an antique Roman sarcophagus.

Frederick, the only surviving son of Henry (VII), was named in the testament of his grandfather Frederick II, where the Emperor entrusted him with the Duchy of Austria, the Marquisate of Styria and 10,000 uncias. His death in 1251 was recorded by Matthew Paris, who claimed that both he and his older brother were poisoned (veneno interfecit).

Among the rulers of the Holy Roman Empire, Henry is numbered only in parentheses, as he did not exercise the sole kingship. He is not to be confused with the later emperor Henry VII who actually ruled the Empire from 1308 onwards. Long time in his father's shadow and disparaged as "Parentheses Henry", several historians in recent years have adopted a more positive view of his Hohenstaufen policies.

== See also ==
- Dukes of Swabia family tree

== Notes ==
Henry (VII) of Germany House of Hohenstaufen Born: 1211 Died: 1242
Regnal titles
Preceded by Frederick II	King of Sicily; 1212–1217 with Frederick II	Succeeded by Frederick II
Preceded by Frederick II	Duke of Swabia; 1216–1235	Succeeded by Conrad IV
Preceded by Frederick II	King of Germany; King of Italy; 1220–1235	Succeeded by Conrad IV
