= Confoederatio cum principibus ecclesiasticis =

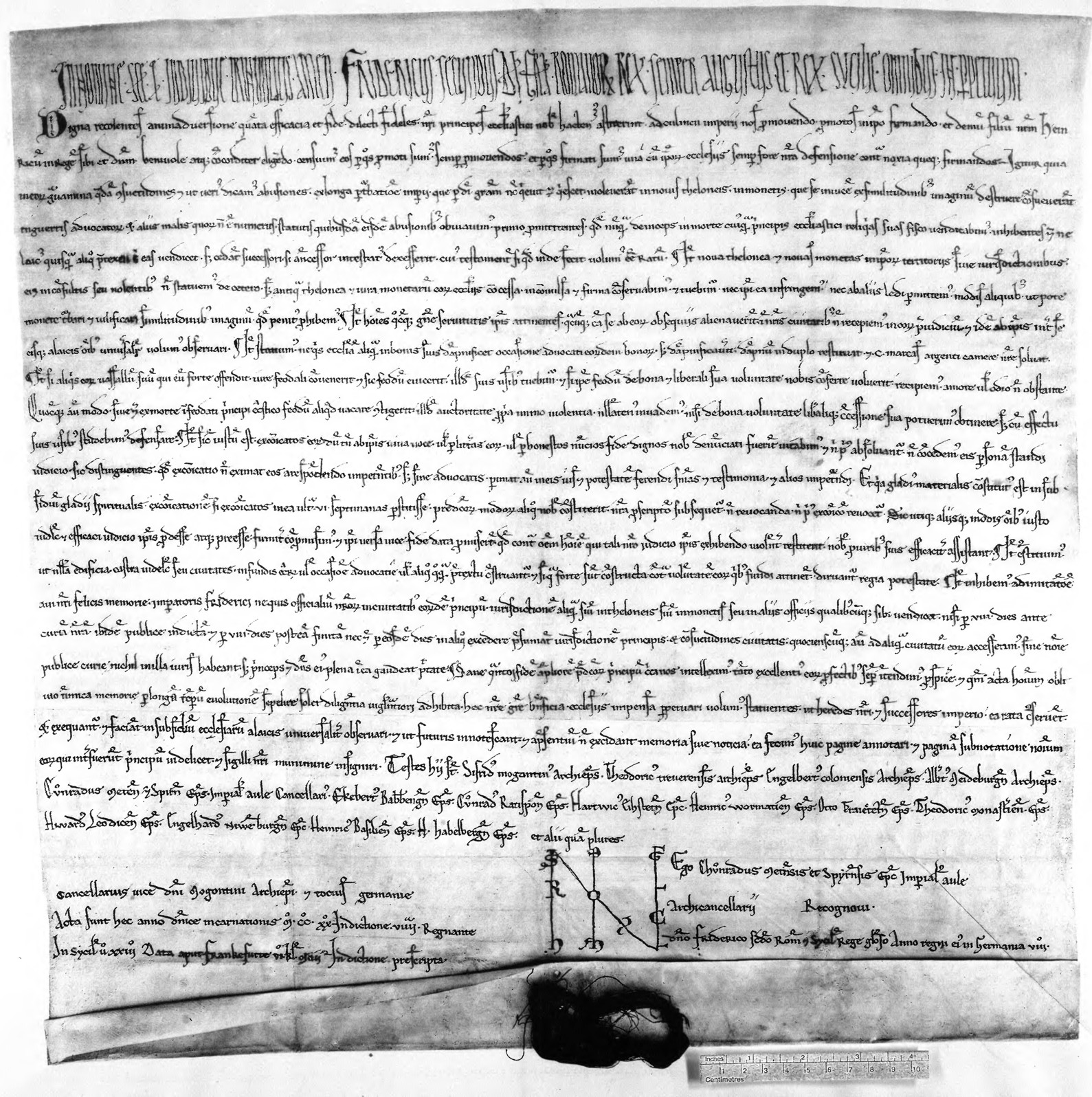
Specification for the bishop of Eichstätt of the privilege for "Treaty with the princes of the church" from Emperor Friedrich II

The Confoederatio cum principibus ecclesiasticis ("Treaty with the princes of the church") was decreed on 26 April 1220 by Frederick II as a concession to the German bishops in return for their co-operation in the election of his son Henry as King. It was an important source of law of the Holy Roman Empire, and was counted among its constitutional documents by the editors of the Monumenta Germaniae Historica.

In this law Frederick II relinquished a number of important Royal rights (Regalia) to the spiritual princes. Among other things, the bishops received the rights to mint coins and levy tolls in the German part of the Holy Roman Empire and to build fortifications. Moreover, they gained the right to hold courts in their lordships and to receive the assistance of the King or the Emperor in carrying out the sentences passed there. Acceptance of the sentences by the King or Emperor was guaranteed: condemnation by the ecclesiastical courts automatically meant condemnation and punishment by the Royal or Imperial courts as well. Therefore, the pronouncement of excommunication by an ecclesiastical court was invariably followed by the sentence of outlawry from the King or the Emperor.

The decreeing of this law, taken in conjunction with the later Statutum in favorem principum, which granted similar concessions to the secular or lay princes, made the power and influence of the spiritual territorial princes in relation to the Empire and the towns extraordinarily great. Frederick's aim was to leave the Empire north of the Alps secure under the direct rule of the princes, allowing him to concentrate his efforts on the southern part of the Empire. This rule of the land by the princes was nevertheless secured at the expense of the centralised power of the monarchy.

== Sources ==
- Zippelius, Reinhold. Kleine deutsche Verfassungsgeschichte, 7th ed. Munich: 2006, ISBN 978-3-406-47638-9.
- Dietmar Willoweit: Deutsche Verfassungsgeschichte. Vom Frankenreich bis zur Wiedervereinigung Deutschlands. 5. erweiterte und um eine Zeittafel und einen Kartenanhang ergänzte Auflage. Beck, München 2005, ISBN 3-406-52637-3, (Juristische Kurz-Lehrbücher), § 10 II 2.
