= Statutum in favorem principum =

1231 law of the Holy Roman Empire

The Statutum in favorem principum ("Statute in favour of the princes") of 1231, reaffirmed in 1232, counts as one of the most important sources of law of the Holy Roman Empire on German territory.

In May 1231 Frederick II's son Henry, King of Germany, issued the grant under pressure from the German secular princes during his rebellion against his father. The terms were very similar to those conceded to the ecclesiastical princes or bishops in the Confoederatio cum principibus ecclesiasticis at the time of the Henry's coronation (in 1220), conferring similar rights. Frederick II confirmed the grant in May 1232.

In this law, the Emperor relinquished a number of important Royal rights ("Regalia") to the secular princes. Among other things, they received the rights to mint coins and levy tolls in the German part of the Holy Roman Empire. In particular, however, Frederick granted them the right of approval over any legislation proposed in future by the Emperor.

The decreeing of this law together with the previous Confoederatio made the power and influence of the territorial princes in relation to the Empire and the towns extraordinarily great. Frederick's aim was to leave his Empire north of the Alps secure under the direct rule of the princes, allowing him to concentrate his efforts on the southern part of the Empire. This rule of the land by the princes was nevertheless secured at the expense of the centralised power of the monarchy.

== Sources ==
- Zippelius, Reinhold. Kleine deutsche Verfassungsgeschichte, 7th. ed. Munich: 2006 ISBN 978-3-406-47638-9.
