= Fort Konstantin (Germany) =

Historical fortress in Koblenz, Germany

Coordinates: 50.3506°N 7.5862°E

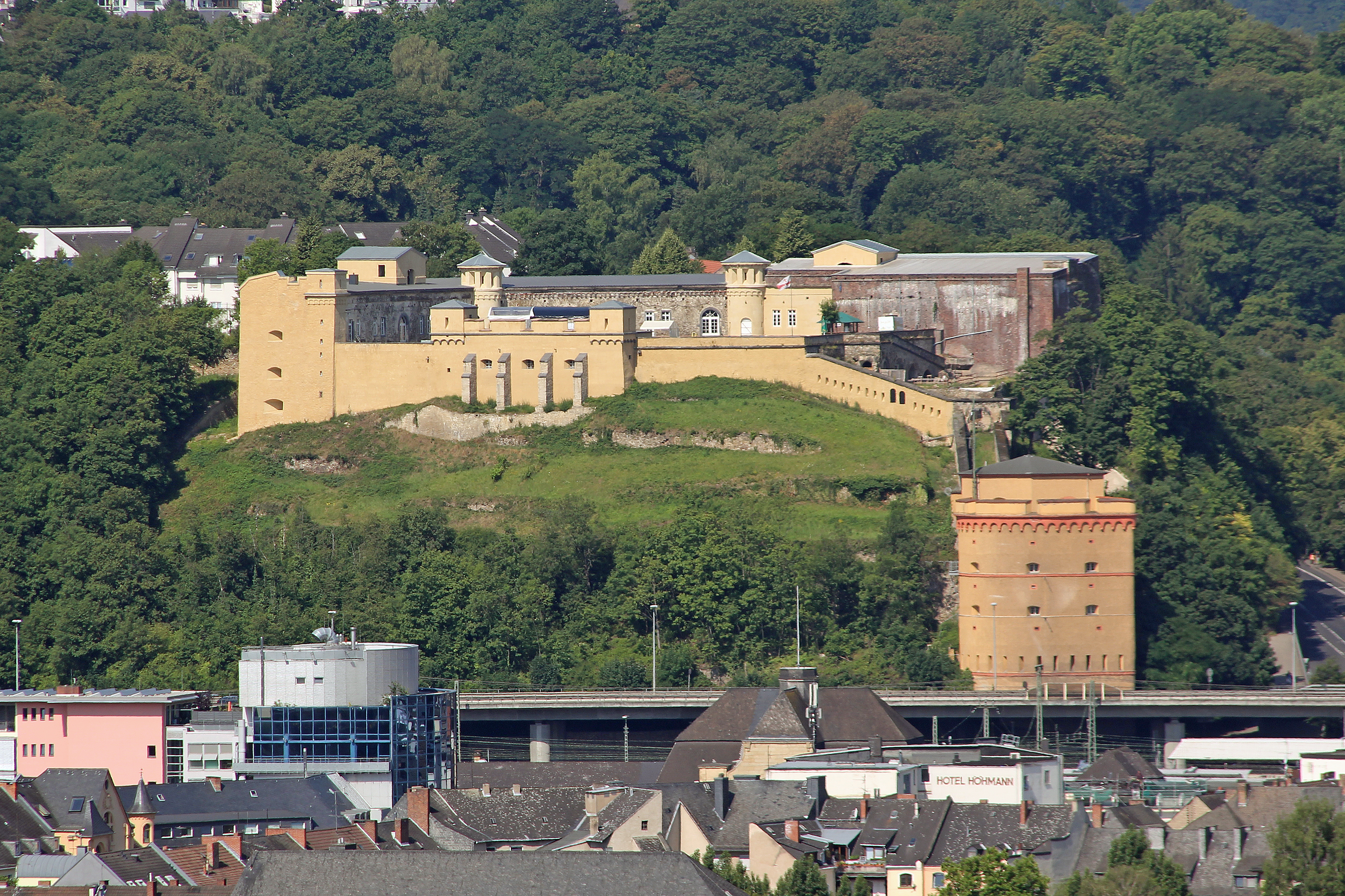
East side view of Fort Konstantin

Fort Constantin or Fort Grand Duke Constantine (German: Fort Großfürst Konstantin, Fort Konstantin) is a historical fortress in Koblenz-Karthause district of Koblenz, Germany, built in 1827/1828. It was part of the Prussian fortress system of Koblenz and Ehrenbreitstein. It was named after the Grand Duke Konstantin Pavlovich of Russia. Currently it is a tourist destination managed by PRO KONSTANTIN e. V.

It is under the protection of the Hague Convention for the Protection of Cultural Property in the Event of Armed Conflict.
