= Sterrenberg Castle (Rhineland) =

- Burg Sterrenberg
- Kamp-Bornhofen
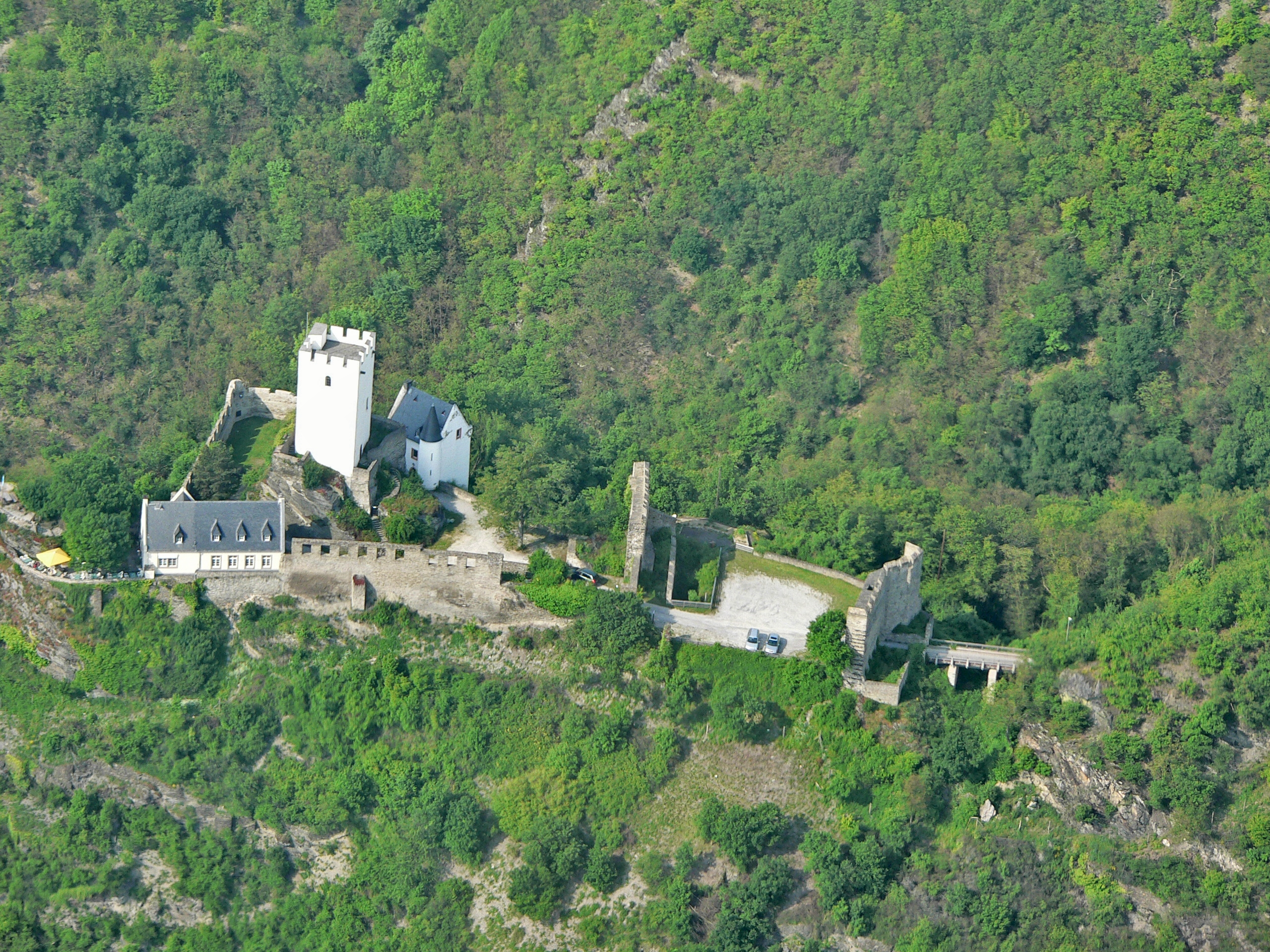

Site information
- Type: Medieval castle

Location
- Coordinates: 50°12′48.3″N 7°37′59.3″E

Site history
- Built: 1190

Sterrenberg Castle (German: Burg Sterrenberg) is a castle above the village of Kamp-Bornhofen in Rhineland-Palatinate, Germany.

== Location ==
Sterrenberg Castle is located in the Rhine Gorge. The Rhine Gorge is a popular name for the Upper Middle Rhine Valley, a 65 km section of the river Rhine between the cities of Koblenz and Bingen in Germany. It was added to the UNESCO list of World Heritage Sites in June 2002 for a unique combination of geological, historical, cultural and industrial reasons.

== History ==
By 1034, Sterrenberg was being mentioned as an imperial castle, but the source is not certain. In 1190, Sterrenberg Castle is listed in the book of Werner von Bolanden as a fief, together with the custom point in Bornhofen. The noble family of Bolanden stayed as lords of Sterrenberg Castle until the second half of the 13th century. From this early period, the bergfried and the first, inner shield wall have survived.

== Sources and external links ==
- Official website
