= Kaub gauging station =

Level measurement site on Rhine in Germany

Coordinates: 50°5.126′N 7°45.898′E

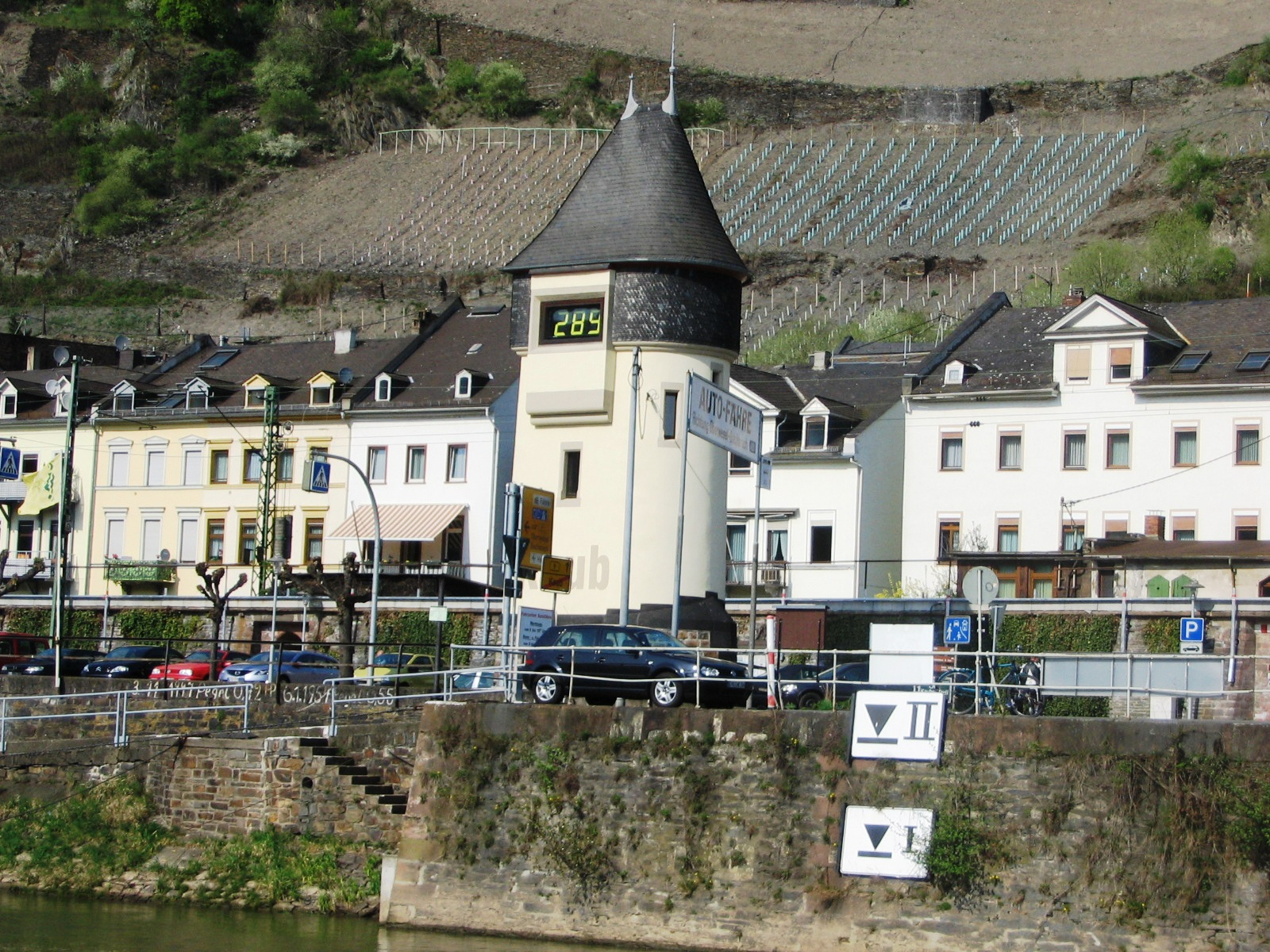
The gauge tower with level indicator and high water marks

The Kaub gauging station (German: Pegel Kaub, Kauber Pegel) is a stream gauge located on the Rhine river in the German city of Kaub. It is a "decisive" water level measurement site for the Rhine, as Kaub is located at the shallowest part of the Middle Rhine and ships with freight from North Sea ports have to pass Kaub on their way to the industrial southwest of Germany. The gauge level does not directly correspond to the actual depth of the river (zero level is not at the riverbed); instead, as is the case with most Rhine gauges, the actual depth of the navigation channel is defined as:

Gauge value + fairway depth (1.9 m) − equivalent water level (0.77 m)

For example, a gauge level of 60 cm corresponds to an actual navigation depth of 0.60 + 1.90 - 0.77 = 1.73 m.

When the level at the gauge reaches the low 75 cm mark, the reduced possible load means that four times as many container barges are required to transport the same volume of goods when compared to the high (250 cm) level. The river becomes nearly impassable for freight at a gauge level of 35 cm (there is no hard lower limit). Navigation is prohibited above the high water mark II (6.40 m).

== Location ==
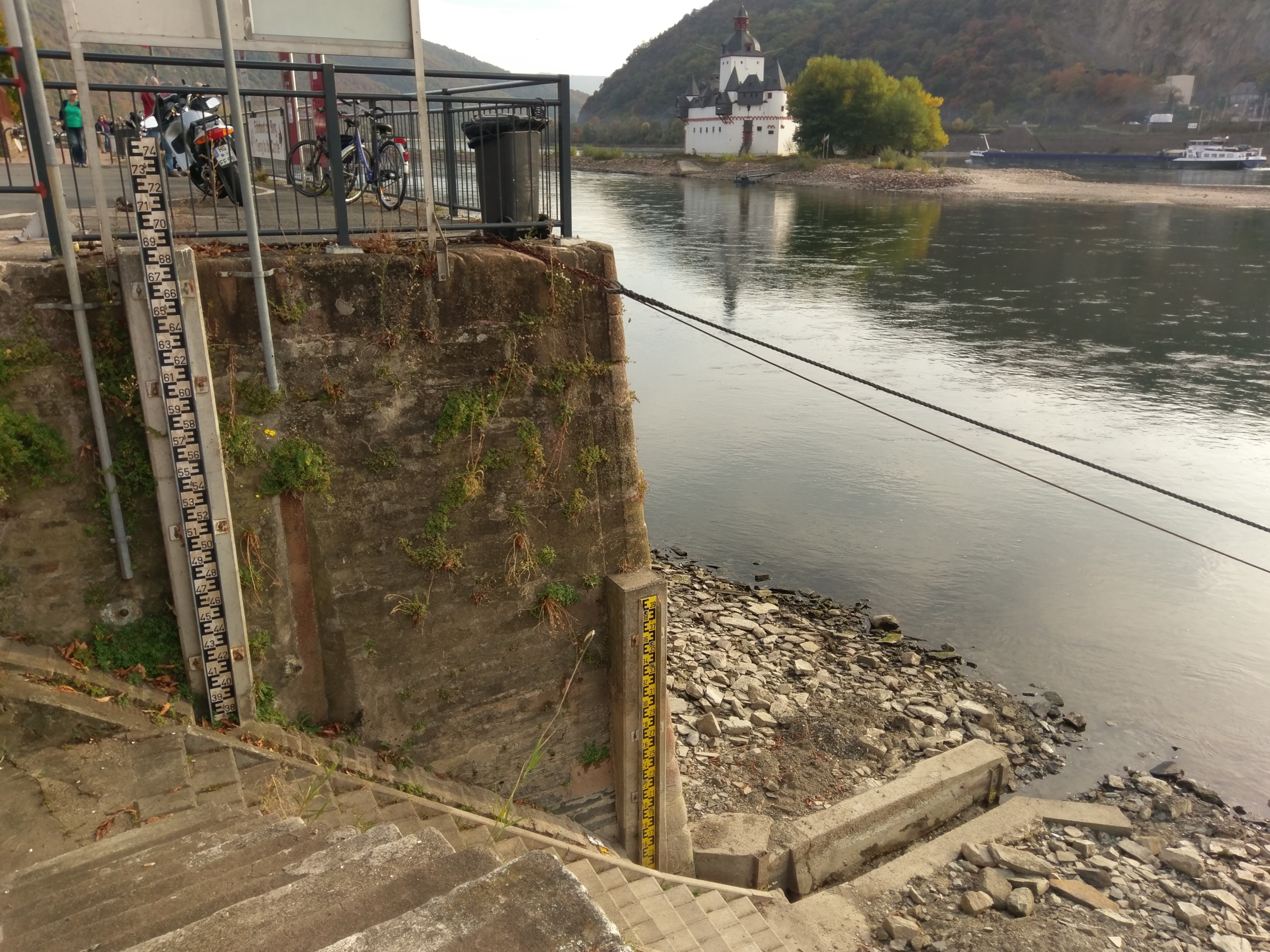
The four line gauges of the station (two short ones, for lower water levels, are located in the ditch)

The gauge is located at Rhine-kilometre 546.3 on the right side of the river (slightly downriver from Pfalzgrafenstein Castle), near the center of Kaub and adjacent to the Kaub ferry, signal mast and the former pilot station.

== History ==
The level gauges on the Middle Rhine date back to 1797, when one was built in Erfelden (currently on the old Rhine riverbed at the Kühkopf-Knoblochsaue). In Kaub, a staff gauge was built in 1856. The gauge tower was built by Prussia and opened on May 18, 1905 with a level recorder and a display of the current water level on a large mechanical indicator (electrified in 1951). Since 1967, the gauge has been equipped with remote data transmission. A measurement announcement device was added in 1968 and a punched tape recorder was set up in 1973. When the gauge was modernised in 2011, paper recording was dropped and a second, redundant, measuring device was installed instead. The measured values are transmitted to the hydrological data center and can be checked at the ELWIS site.

== Role in navigation ==
The Kaub gauge is of central importance to shipping on the Rhine to destinations above Koblenz. The amount of cargo to be carried on the Rhine is limited by the draft of the ship being low enough to pass at Kaub. The load of a large (135 m) container vessel is seriously affected by low water: a full capacity load is possible at the 250 cm level, the load drops to 50% at 135 cm, to 25% at 75 cm, and to 16% at 55 cm.

When the gauge level is below 40 cm, freight navigation is practically impossible, although specially designed vessels can get through even at 35 cm.

For the first time in the history of measurements, the Kaub level slipped into single digits in mid-August 2026.

== Channel deepening ==
The Abladeoptimierung Mittelrhein (Middle Rhine capacity optimization), under consideration since 1992, is a federal infrastructure project intended to mitigate the commercial impacts of severe droughts by removing six primary morphological bottlenecks along a 49-kilometer river segment between Budenheim and St. Goar, including the Kaub stretch of the river. The project will remove 2,900 cubic meters of alluvial sediment and 1,850 cubic meters of bedrock from the fairway at the Kaub–St. Goar stretch and provide an increase of the assured fairway depth from 1.90 meters to 2.10 meters (at the equivalent water level). The works are managed by the Federal Waterways and Shipping Administration, the plan (under approval since late 2025) involves the use of rock-breaking machinery and installation of submerged bed sills to redirect sediment flow. The targeted completion date is 2033 at the cost of 225 million euro. The project is expected to provide significant economic benefits, with the 20-centimeter depth increase permitting additional 200-250 tonnes of cargo for a typical barge at low water.

== Information ==
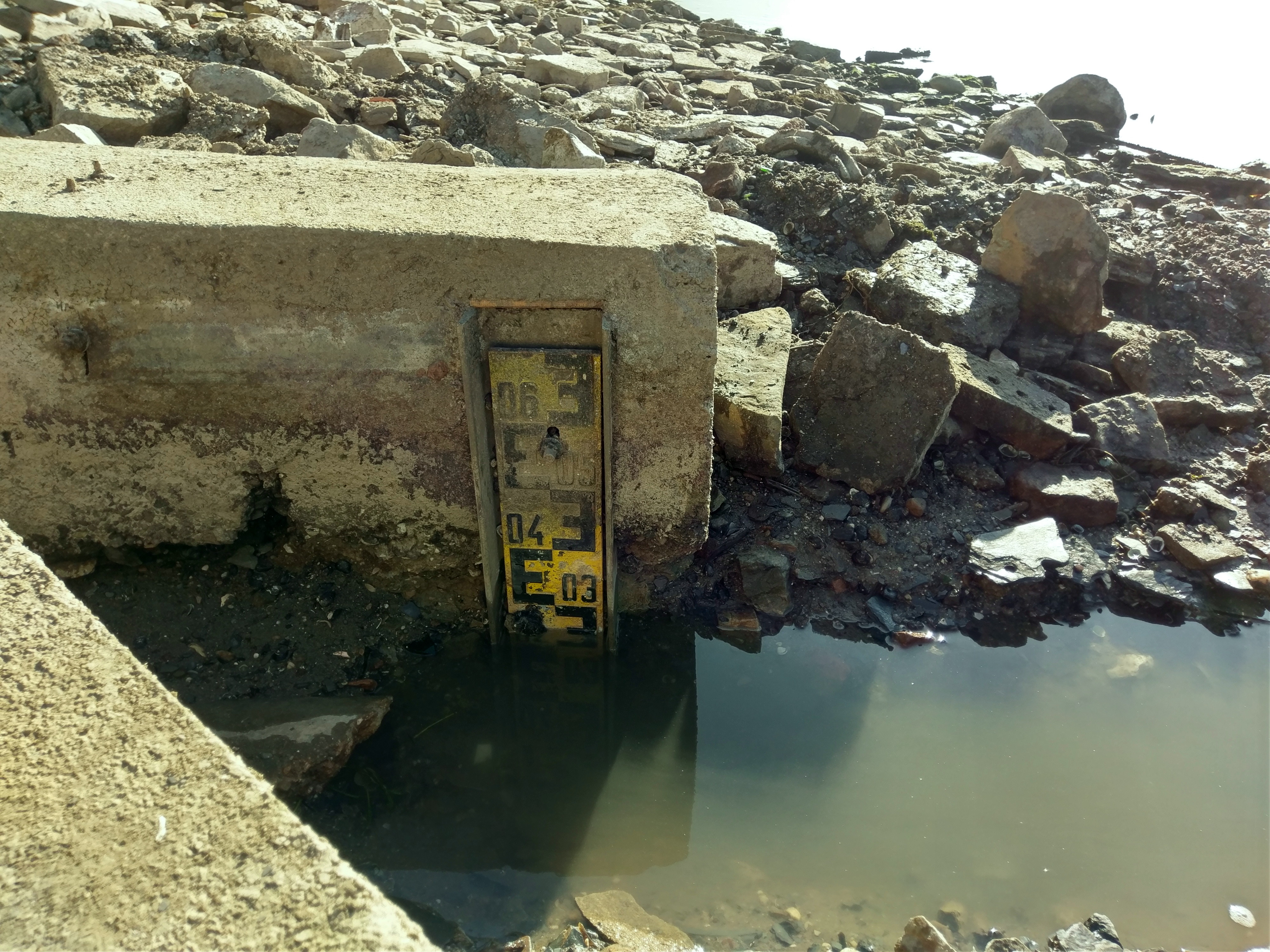
24 cm level on October 21, 2018

Information about the gauge:

- Zero level: 67.669 m above sea level (since November 1, 2019)
- High water mark I (HSW I): 4.60 m
- High water mark II (HSW II): 6.40 m (shipping prohibited)
- Highest water level (HHW): (1883) 8.25 m
- Mean water level (MW) in the time series 2010-2020: 2.08 m
- Lowest observed level (NNW) (22 October 2018): 0.25 m (some sources provide 0.24 m; the negative 0.06 m reading on 1 October 2026 has not yet made it into the record)
- Equivalent water level (GlW): 0.77 m (since January 1, 2023)
- Fairway depth (TuGlW): 1.90 m
- Water levels for the last 30 days: Federal Institute for Hydrology
- Recent levels: Federal Administration of Waterways and Shipping

== Floods ==
Date	Level in cm
November 28, 1882	811
January 5, 1883	825
February 2, 1893	911 (level affected by ice)
January 16, 1920	792
January 19, 1955	750
February 27, 1970	793
May 29, 1983	741
March 29, 1988	819
December 23, 1993	766
January 29, 1995	780

== Sources ==
- Ademmer, Martin; Jannsen, Nils; Mösle, Saskia (2020). Extreme weather events and economic activity: The case of low water levels on the Rhine river (PDF) (Report). Kiel Working Paper. Kiel: Kiel Institute for the World Economy.
- Bundesanstalt für Gewässerkunde (2026). "KAUB, RHEIN, Wasserstand: Rohdaten der letzten 31 Tage" [Kaub, Rhine, water level: raw data of the last 31 days] (in German).
- Bundesministerium für Verkehr (12 December 2025). Nachbewertungsergebnisse der Tabelle-B-Projekte des Investitionsrahmenplans (IRP) 2025–2029 für die Bundeswasserstraßen [Re-evaluation results for the Table B projects of the 2025–2029 Investment Framework Plan for the federal waterways] (PDF) (Report) (in German).
- Contargo (July 2017). Low Water (PDF) (Report). Contargo GmbH & Co. KG.
- ELWIS (2026). "Pegel KAUB" [Kaub gauge]. ELWIS (in German).
- Hochwarth, Dominik (14 August 2026). "Pegel Kaub fällt auf historischen Tiefstand, der Rheinausbau zieht sich seit 1992" [Kaub gauge falls to a historic low, while the Rhine improvement project has dragged on since 1992]. ingenieur.de (in German). VDI Verlag.
- Landesamt für Umwelt Rheinland-Pfalz (2026). "Kaub: Pegelkennwerte" [Kaub: gauge characteristic values]. Hochwasservorhersagezentrale Rheinland-Pfalz (in German).
- Wasserstraßen- und Schifffahrtsamt Rhein (17 November 2025). Abladeoptimierung der Fahrrinnen am Mittelrhein, Teilabschnitt 3 „Jungferngrund“ und „Geisenrücken“, Rhein-km 547,50 bis 557,00, und Ufermodellierung am Tauber Werth: Erläuterungsbericht [Fairway draught optimization on the Middle Rhine, subsection 3 "Jungferngrund" and "Geisenrücken", Rhine km 547.50 to 557.00, and bank modification at Tauber Werth: Explanatory report] (PDF) (Report) (in German).
- Wasserstraßen- und Schifffahrtsverwaltung des Bundes (2026). "Pegel Kaub: Wasserstand Rohdaten" [Kaub gauge: water level raw data]. Pegelonline (in German).
