= Toll castle =

Medieval castle which guarded and controlled a customs post

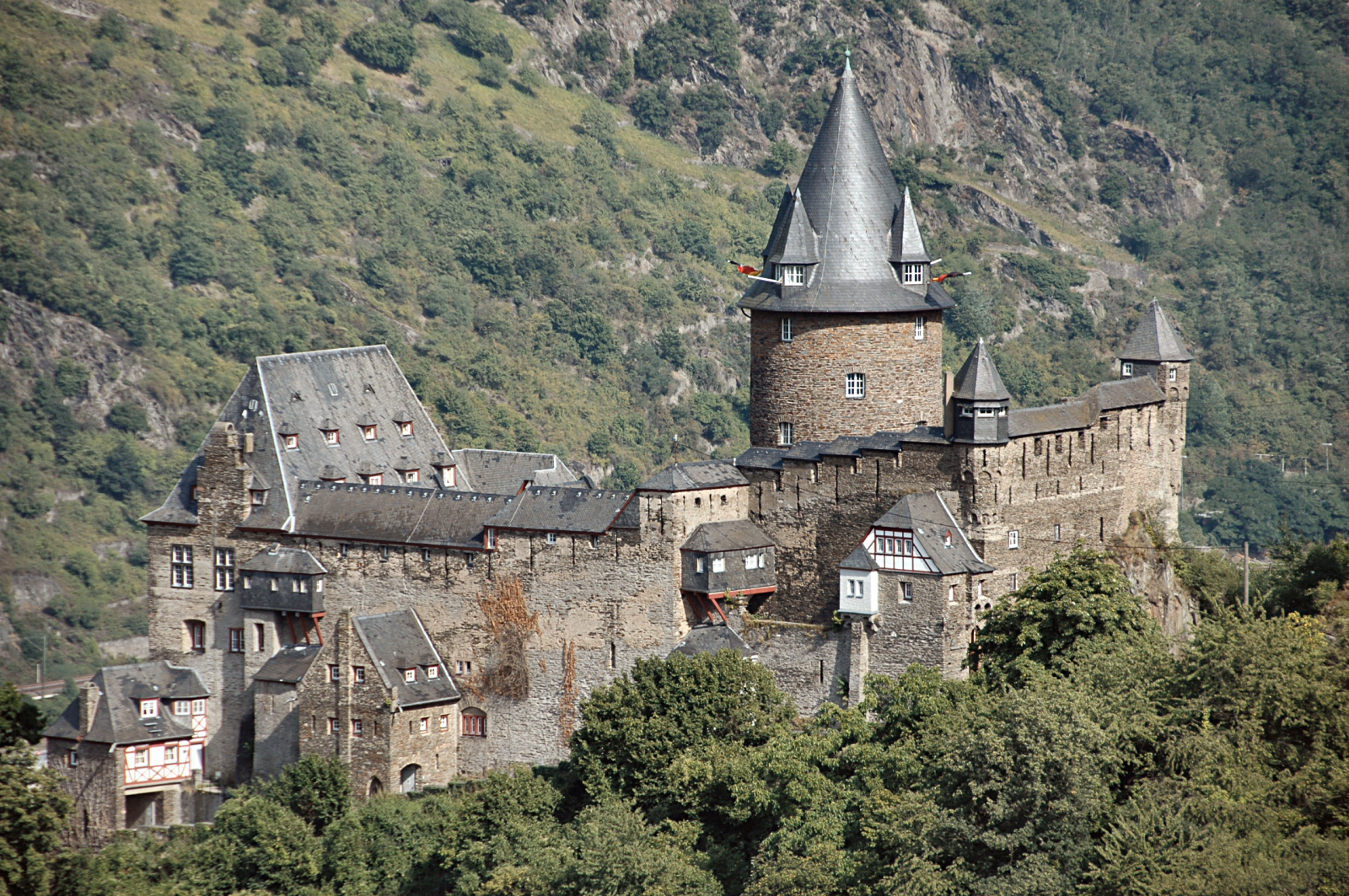
The toll castle of Stahleck in Bacharach

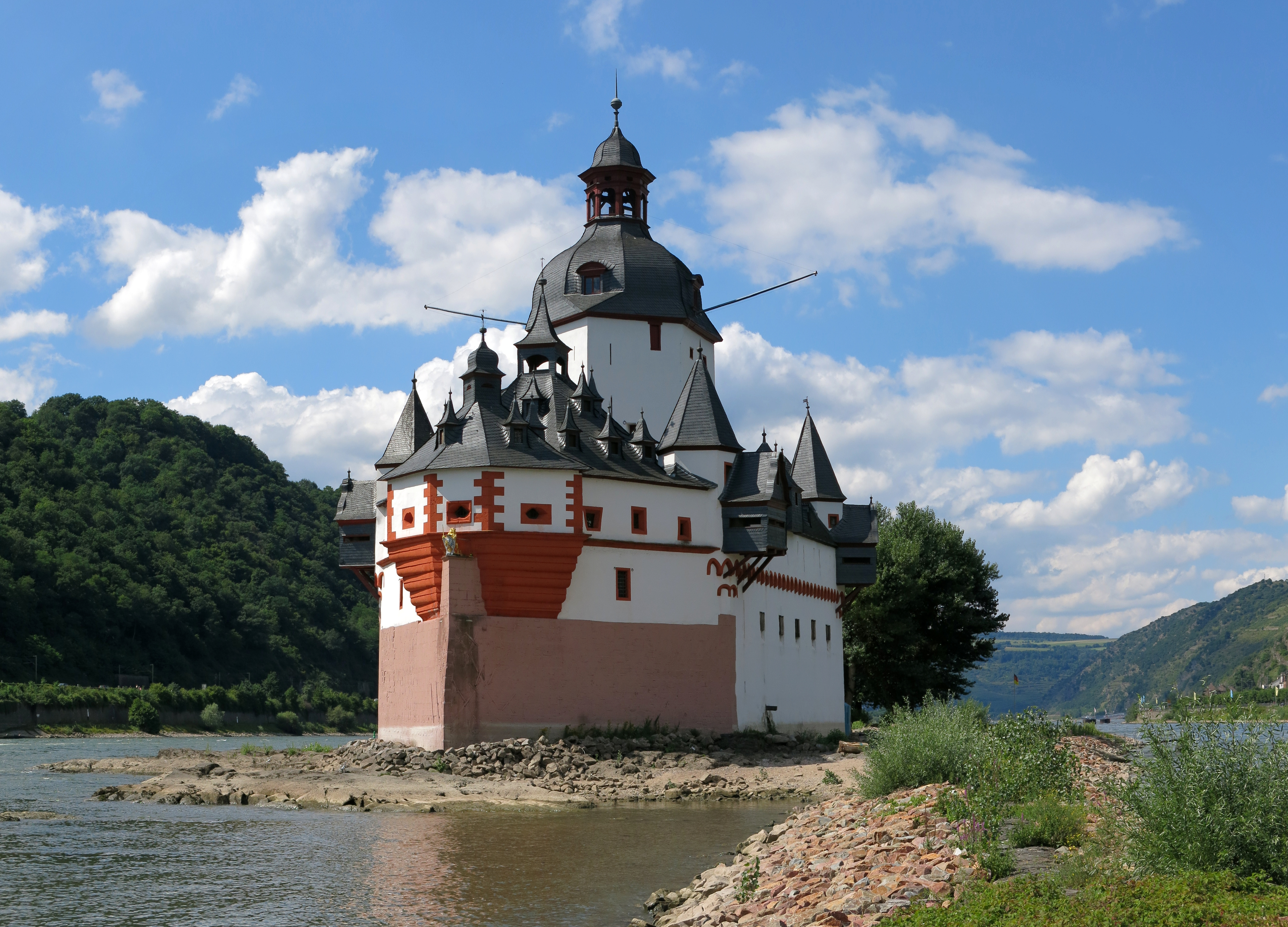
Pfalzgrafenstein Castle

A toll castle (German: Zollburg) is a castle that, in the Middle Ages and the Early Modern Era, guarded a customs post and was intended to control it. They were typically found in the Holy Roman Empire. Toll castles always stood in the vicinity of an important long-distance trade route over, for example, the Alpine passes or the Middle Rhine. Such castles were usually placed at strategic locations, such as border crossings, river crossings or mountain passes, and were manned by armed guards. The actual toll-collecting point lay below at the road or river and was often linked by walls to the castle itself.

Toll castles belonged to the respective territorial lords or to vassals, to whom the duty and right to collect the toll had been delegated by these lords. Most toll castles also had additional administrative and other functions, as border watch posts or residences, such as for example Stahleck Castle above Bacharach on the Rhine. Some, such as Pfalzgrafenstein Castle in the middle of the Rhine near Kaub, were, however, purely customs points and only collected tolls.

== Examples ==
=== Austria ===
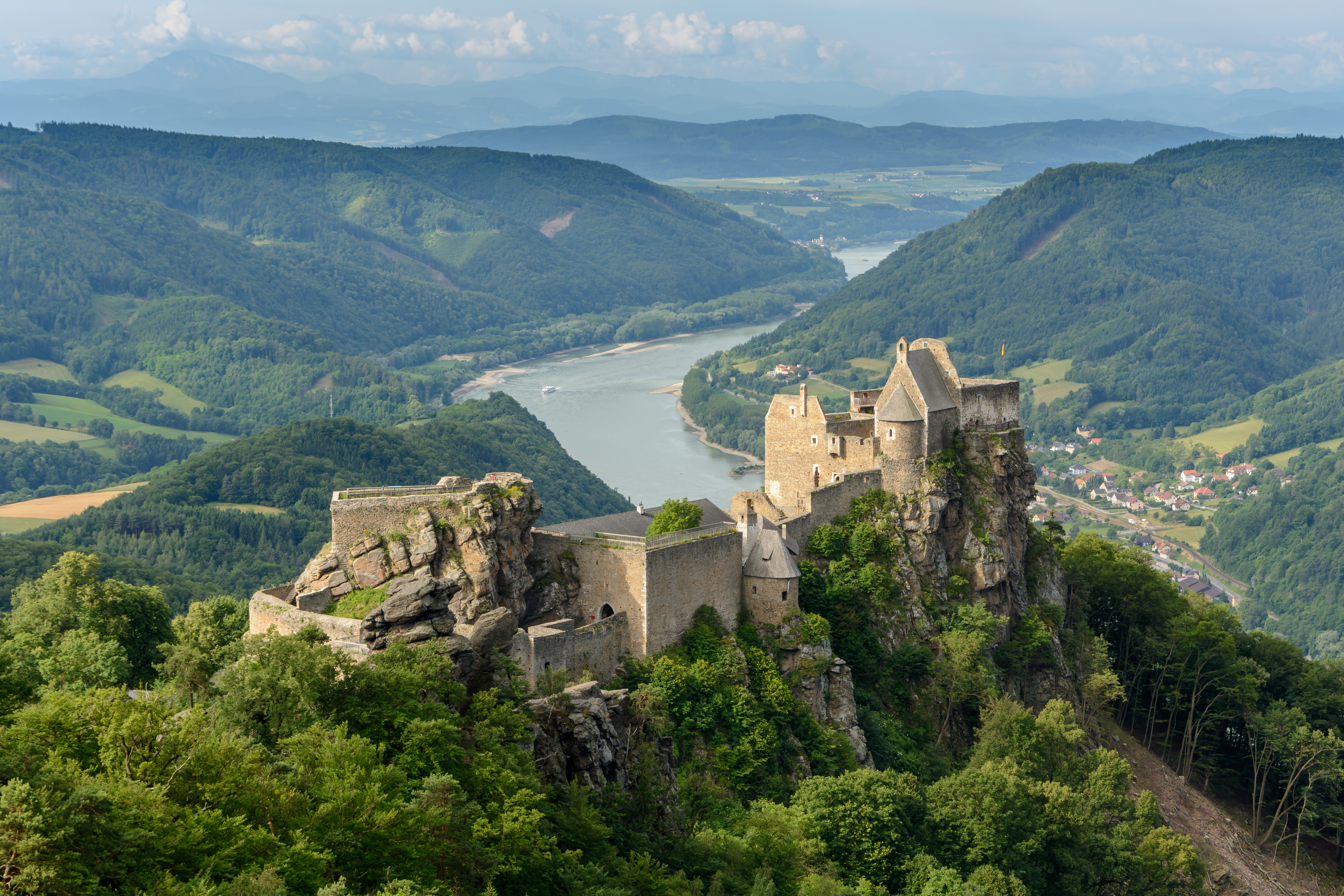
Aggstein Castle

- Aggstein Castle
- Aschach an der Donau
- Hohenwerfen Castle

=== France ===
- Château d'Annecy
- Châteauneuf-du-Pape

=== Germany ===
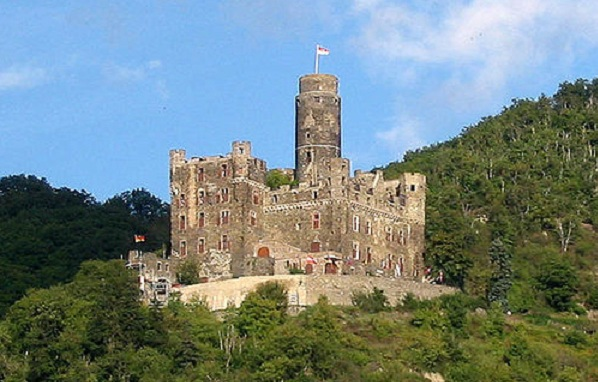
Maus Castle

- Katz Castle
- Maus Castle
- Pfalzgrafenstein Castle
- Rüdesheim am Rhein
- Scherenburg Castle
- Stahleck Castle

=== Italy ===
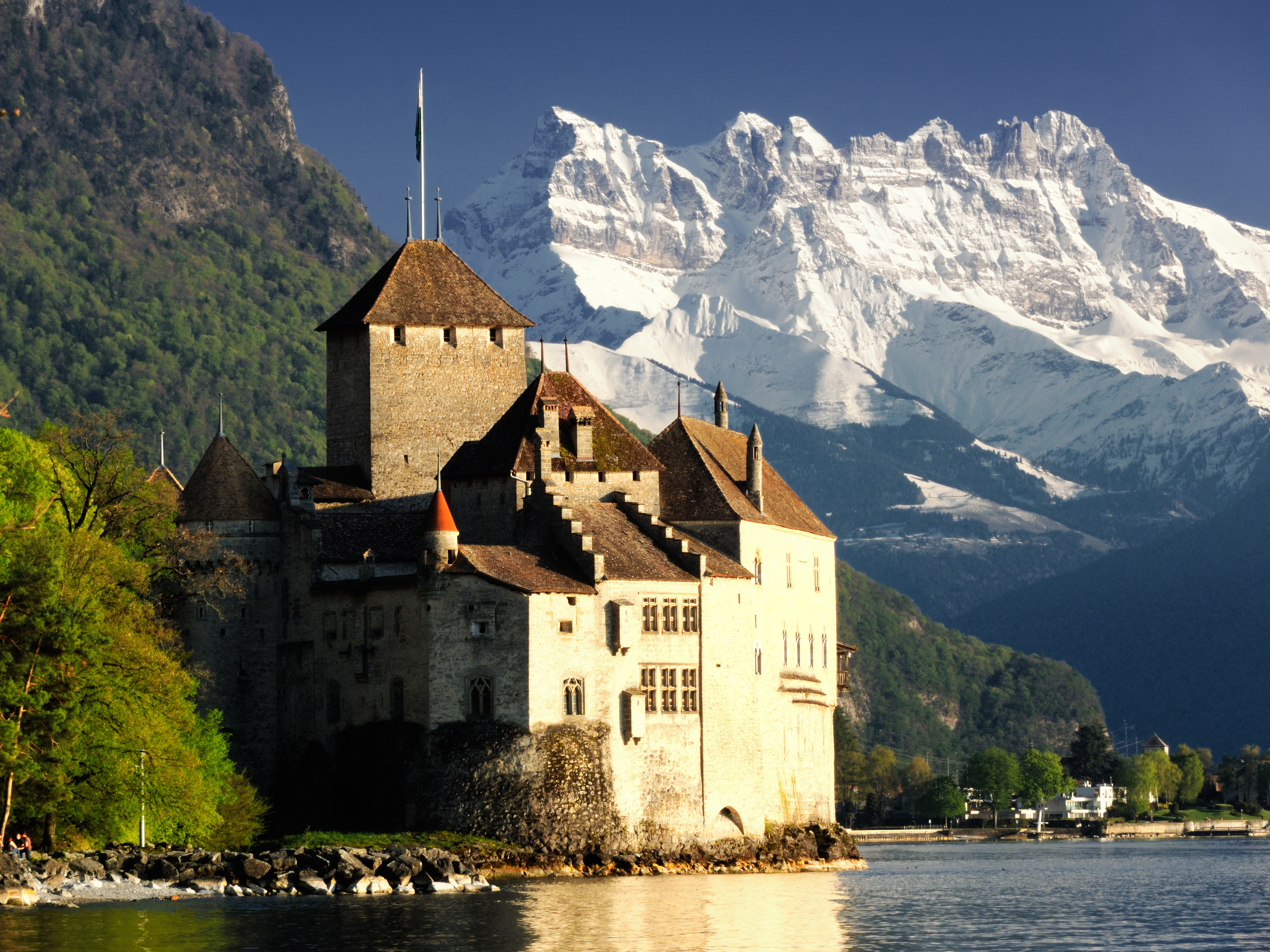
Chillon Castle

- Pont-Saint-Martin, Aosta Valley
- Reifenstein Castle
- Sarriod de la Tour Castle

=== Romania ===
- Bran Castle

=== Slovakia ===
- Strečno Castle

=== Switzerland ===
- Château de Chillon

== Sources ==
- de Fabianis, Valeria, ed. (2013). Castles of the World. New York: Metro Books. ISBN 978-1-4351-4845-1.
- Horst Wolfgang Böhme, Reinhard Friedrich, Barbara Schock-Werner, ed. (2004). Wörterbuch der Burgen, Schlösser und Festungen. Stuttgart: Philipp Reclam. ISBN 3-15-010547-1. p. 272.
