= Pfalzgrafenstein Castle =

Toll castle in the River Rhine near Kaub, Germany

- Burg Pfalzgrafenstein
- Kaub, Germany
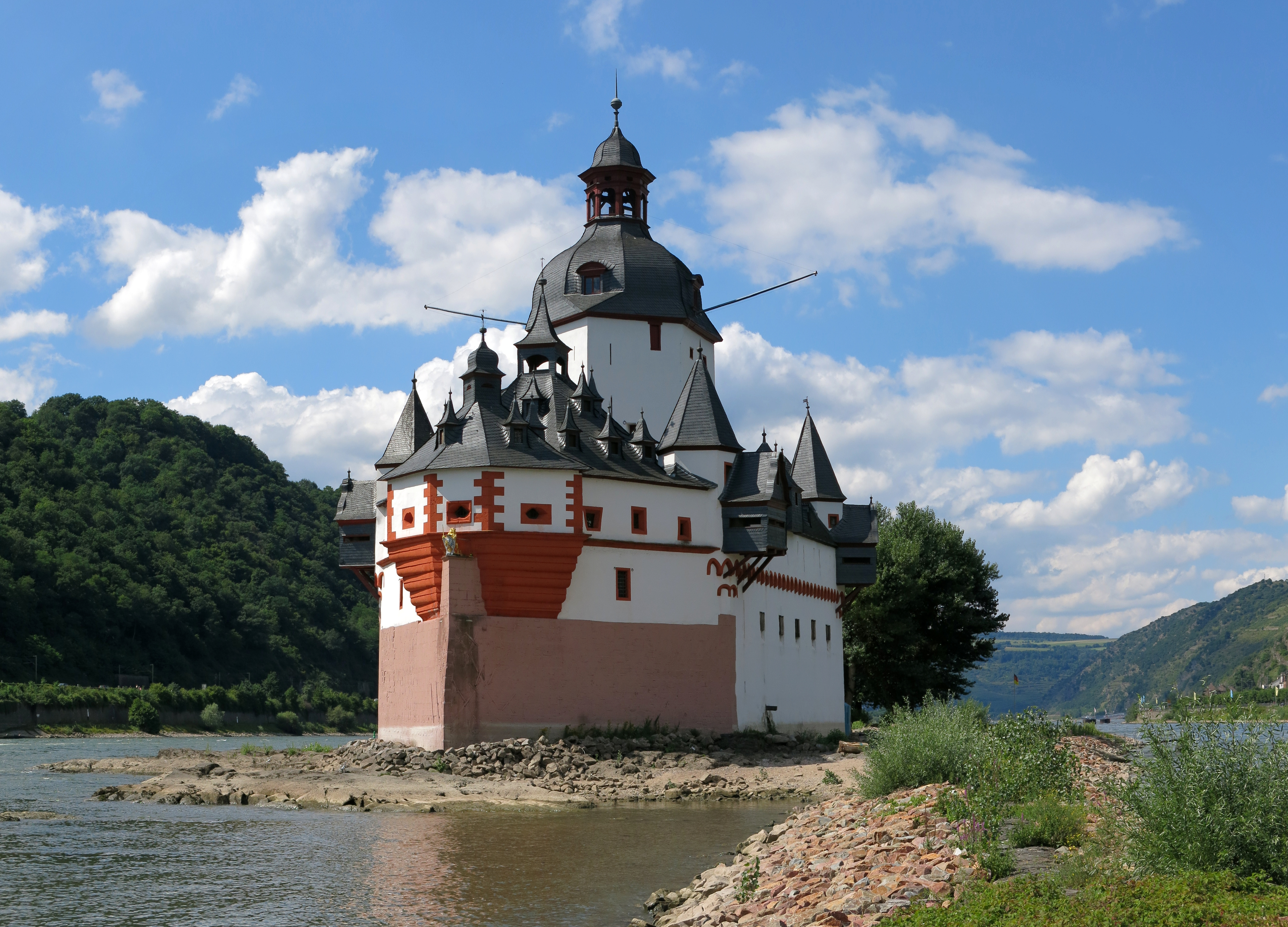
- Pfalzgrafenstein Castle seen from the bank of the Rhine

Site information
- Type: Toll castle, Island castle
- Controlled by: State of Rhineland-Palatinate
- Open to the public: Yes
- Condition: Preserved

Location
- Coordinates: 50°04′59″N 7°45′57″E
- Height: 36 metres

Site history
- Built: 1326/27
- Built by: King Ludwig the Bavarian
- Battles/wars: War of the Succession of Landshut, Thirty Years' War

Garrison information
- Garrison: 1689: 20 – 54 men

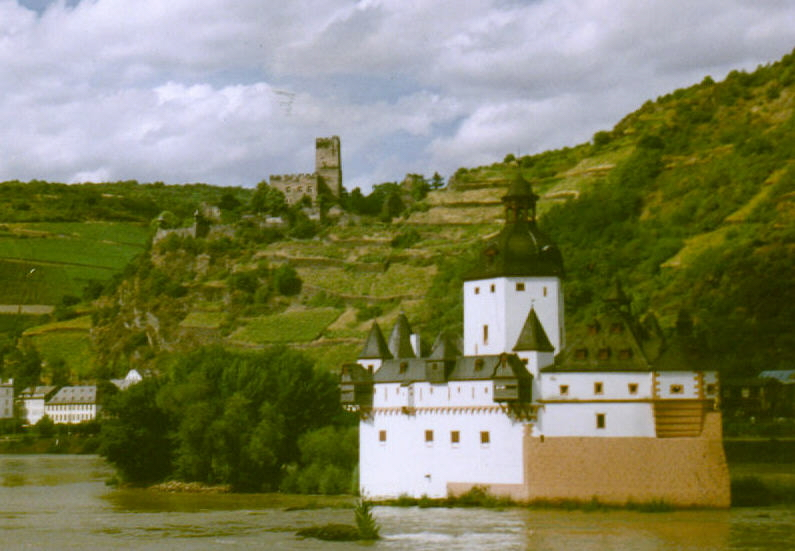
Pfalzgrafenstein Castle with Kaub and Gutenfels Castle in the background, photographed in 2005

Pfalzgrafenstein Castle (German: Burg Pfalzgrafenstein), (Note: pronounced [bʊʁk pfaːlts.kʁafn.ʃtaɪn]) also known as the Pfalz, is a toll castle situated on Falkenau island in the Rhine River, adjacent to Kaub, Germany.

First established in 1326/27 by King Ludwig IV the Bavarian, the castle served to collect river tolls from passing traffic. Also seeing military activity, it withstood a 39 day siege in 1504 in the War of the Succession of Landshut and was occupied by Spanish forces for 11 years from 1620 in the Thirty Year's War. The castle has undergone various modifications since its original construction, most notably modernising fortifications in 1607 and the addition of a baroque tower cap in 1714. Pfalzgrafenstein Castle was used as a key point for the crossing of the Rhine in 1814 by Russo-Prussian forces during the campaign against Napoleon. Toll collection ceased in 1867, but the castle has remained in good condition and is now preserved as a public museum.

== Description ==
The central pentagonal tower of Pfalzgrafenstein Castle is 36 metres high, with 6 storeys. The 25 metre high outer wall gives the castle a footprint of 51 x 21 meters. The wall is 2.60 meters thick and includes two battlements. Today preserved as a public museum, the interior contains furniture from the 17th to 19th centuries and household items made of clay and tin. There is a 17th century pizza oven on the second floor. The castle entrance has a wooden portcullis sheathed in iron set against the inner wall.

French writer Victor Hugo described the castle as "a stone ship, eternally floating on the Rhine, eternally anchored before the Palatinate town".

The area is part of the Rhine Gorge, which was added to the UNESCO list of World Heritage Sites in June 2002.

== History ==
=== Construction and early history ===
The original central tower of Pfalzgrafenstein Castle was built in 1326/27 by King Ludwig (Louis IV) of Bavaria to increase his toll revenue. Today the tower is 36 metres high and has 6 storeys. Since it stood alone, it was built pentagonally as a wave- and ice-breaker. In reaction, Pope John XXII incited his bishops of Mainz, Trier and Cologne to excommunicate Ludwig, as they were concerned that his construction threatened to undermine their own nearby toll collections at the Mouse Tower at Bingen and at Stolzenfels Castle, near Koblenz. Pope John XXII had already attempted to excommunicate Ludwig in 1325 because of his toll collection at Gutenfels Castle, however this address remained inactive. In c. 1340, it was likely this dispute with the church that caused Ludwig to build a six-sided turreted wall around the tower, 12 metres high, to improve its defence and to serve as a better ice-breaker. Pope John XXII three times requested his bishops of Mainz, Trier and Cologne to take action against the toll at Kaub, but nothing was done.

To ensure tolls were paid, chain booms were raised across the narrow river passage near the castle. If the toll was paid, the chain would be lowered and the ship could pass, or else the ship would be seized and the crew imprisoned in the castle dungeon. Passing ships could not use the wider channel on the other side of the castle due to a treacherous stretch of water downstream. The castle dungeon was a wooden raft at the bottom of a well. Prisoners were lowered by rope and would remain there until a ransom was paid. Tolls were paid at a customs house in Kaub as ships could not dock properly on Falkenau island.

In 1339, Ludwig gifted the castle to Count Rudolph II, the Elector Palatine, his nephew. According to a legal record from 1473, Pfalzgrafenstein Castle was recognised as a site where the Palatine bailiff could imprison defendants and conduct trials, including cases of capital punishment under the authority of the Elector Palatine.

In 1477, Pfalzgrafenstein Castle was given as a deposit to the Count of Katzenelnbogen by Count Palatine Philip of Wittelsbach, expiring on his death. The final male descendent of the Counts of Katzenelnbogen, Philipp I, died in 1479, causing a 44 year-long inheritance dispute lasting until 1523.

=== Military activity and architectural additions ===
In 1504, together with Kaub and nearby Gutenfels Castle, Pfalzgrafenstein Castle withstood a 39 day siege by Landgrave William II of Hesse in the War of the Succession of Landshut. Pfalzgrafenstein survived unscathed. The Hessians withdrew after taking considerable losses in men and artillery.

Additions to Pfalzgrafenstein were made in 1607 by Elector Friedrich IV, adding the gun bastion pointing upstream, interior arcades, and completing the outer wall as it is seen today. These changes allowed modern guns to be brought into the castle much more easily. Pfalzgrafenstein was the first Middle Rhine castle to adapt to this new technology. In 1620, the castle was occupied by Spanish forces under General Spinola in the Thirty Year's War. While there was a brief exchange of gunfire at Kaub, Pfalzgrafenstein Castle was taken without a fight and the garrison permitted to freely withdraw. Hessian forces attacked Kaub and besieged Gutenfels and Pfalzgrafenstein in December 1631 with 400 men, until the Spanish capitulated in January 1632.

During the War of the Spanish Succession (1701–1714), Pfalzgrafenstein Castle was used as to hold prisoners of war. The distinctive baroque tower cap of was added in 1714. The castle's current appearance is a result of a fire and subsequent renovation in 1756.

=== The Napoleonic period ===
In 1793, Gutenfels Castle surrendered to French Revolutionary forces and gave up all military equipment. The French commander had the guns from Pfalzgrafenstein and Gutenfels removed. A few weeks later, after the French had left, the garrison of invalids returned to both castles. They remained there until the garrison was disbanded. The castle was relinquished by the Electoral Palatinate in 1803 to come under control of the House of Nassau, later the Duchy of Nassau following the dissolution of the Holy Roman Empire in 1806.

The island of the castle was used for the crossing of the Rhine by Prussian and Russian forces under Field-Marshal von Blücher in pursuit of Napoleon, following the decisive French defeat at the Battle of Leipzig. On 1 January 1814, a pontoon bridge was constructed by Russian engineers, allowing Blücher's army of 60,000 men, 20,000 horses and 220 guns to cross. The castle had been unoccupied since the garrison of the Electoral Palatinate withdrew in 1803. The army crossed over several days.

=== Late modern period and preservation ===
In 1866 the castle came under Prussian control after the annexation of Nassau in the Seven Weeks War and toll collections ceased in 1867. The river has since been changed significantly to make the wider channel safely navigable. The castle continued to be used as a beacon for river traffic into the 1900s, remaining in good condition.

In 1946, the castle became the property of the state of Rhineland-Palatinate in West Germany and has been administered since 1949. From 1960, the castle was used as a signal station for river traffic. There was restoration work between 1967 and 1975; this included repainting the baroque colour scheme, reopening walled up arrow loops, restoring the original gate and repairing the roof.

Today, Pfalzgrafenstein Castle is preserved as a public museum, reflecting a "reasonably accurately preserved and restored medieval Rhenish castle". It is accessible by ferry from nearby Kaub, when river conditions permit. The castle is closed during December and January.

== Gallery ==
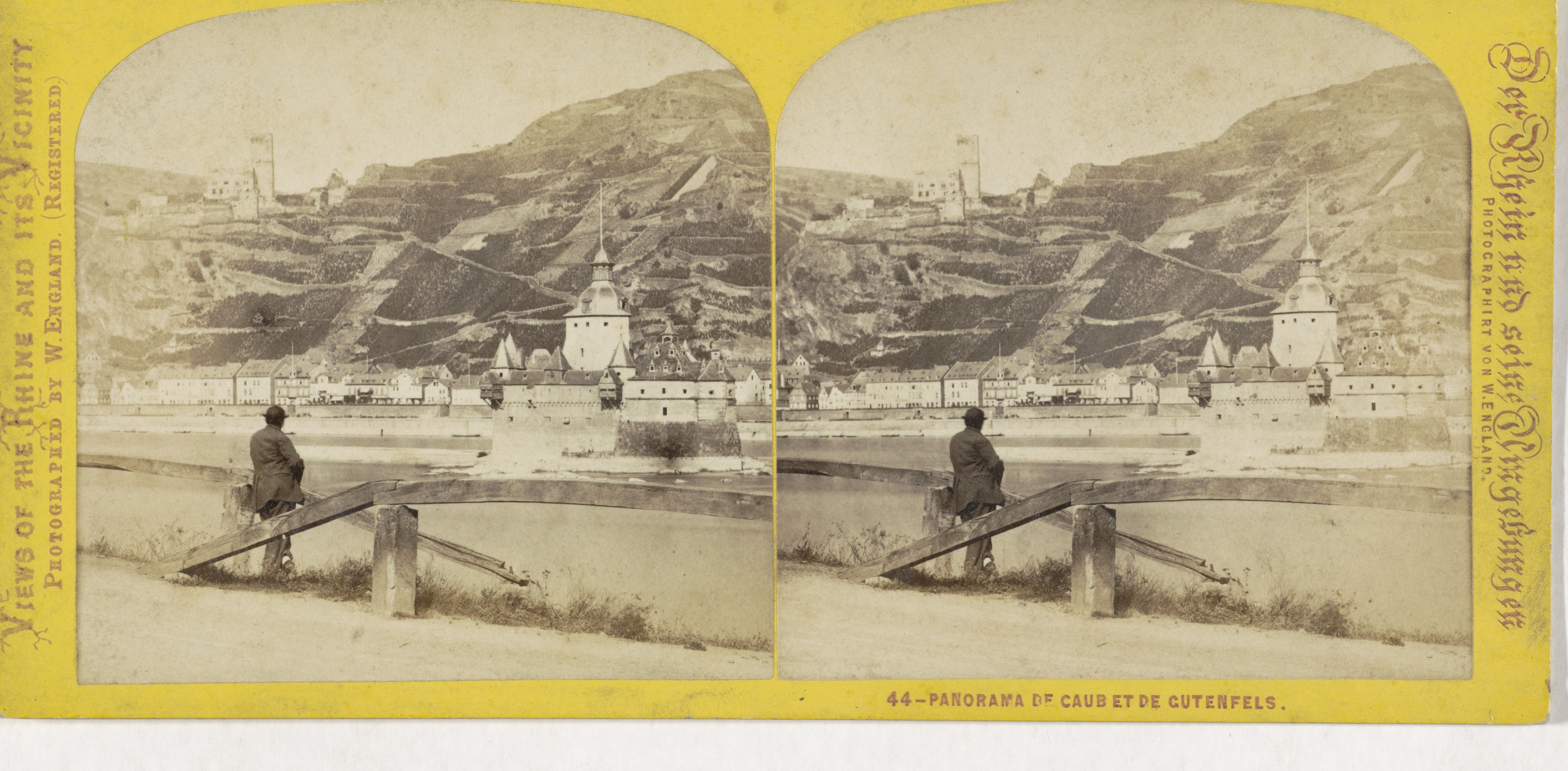
View of Kaub, Gutenfels and Pfalzgrafenstein, photographed 1867/1868 by William England

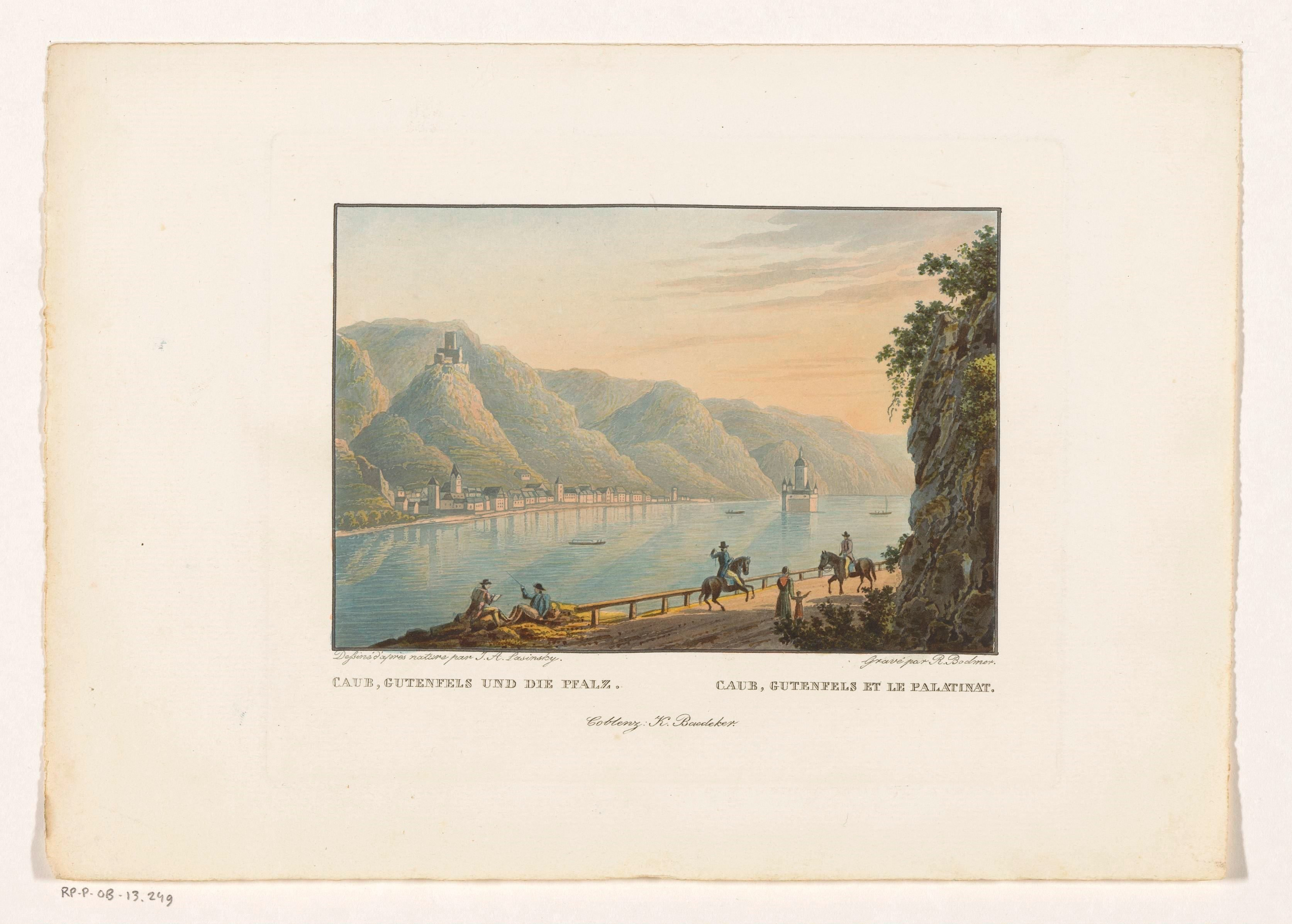
View of Kaub with the castles Gutenfels and Pfalzengrafenstein, 1832 – 1872 by Rudolph Bodmer

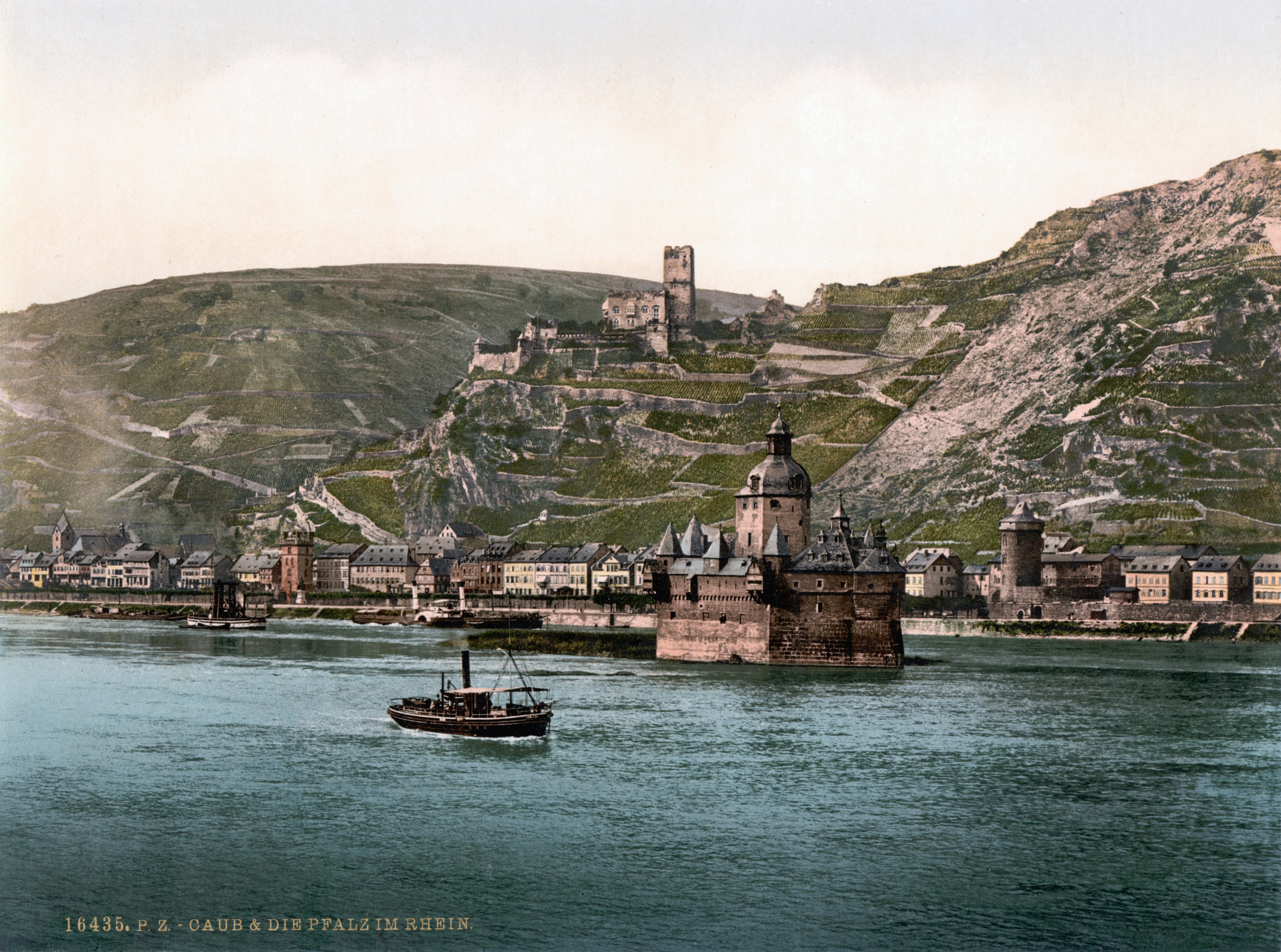
Pfalzgrafenstein Castle depicted in mechanical print around 1900

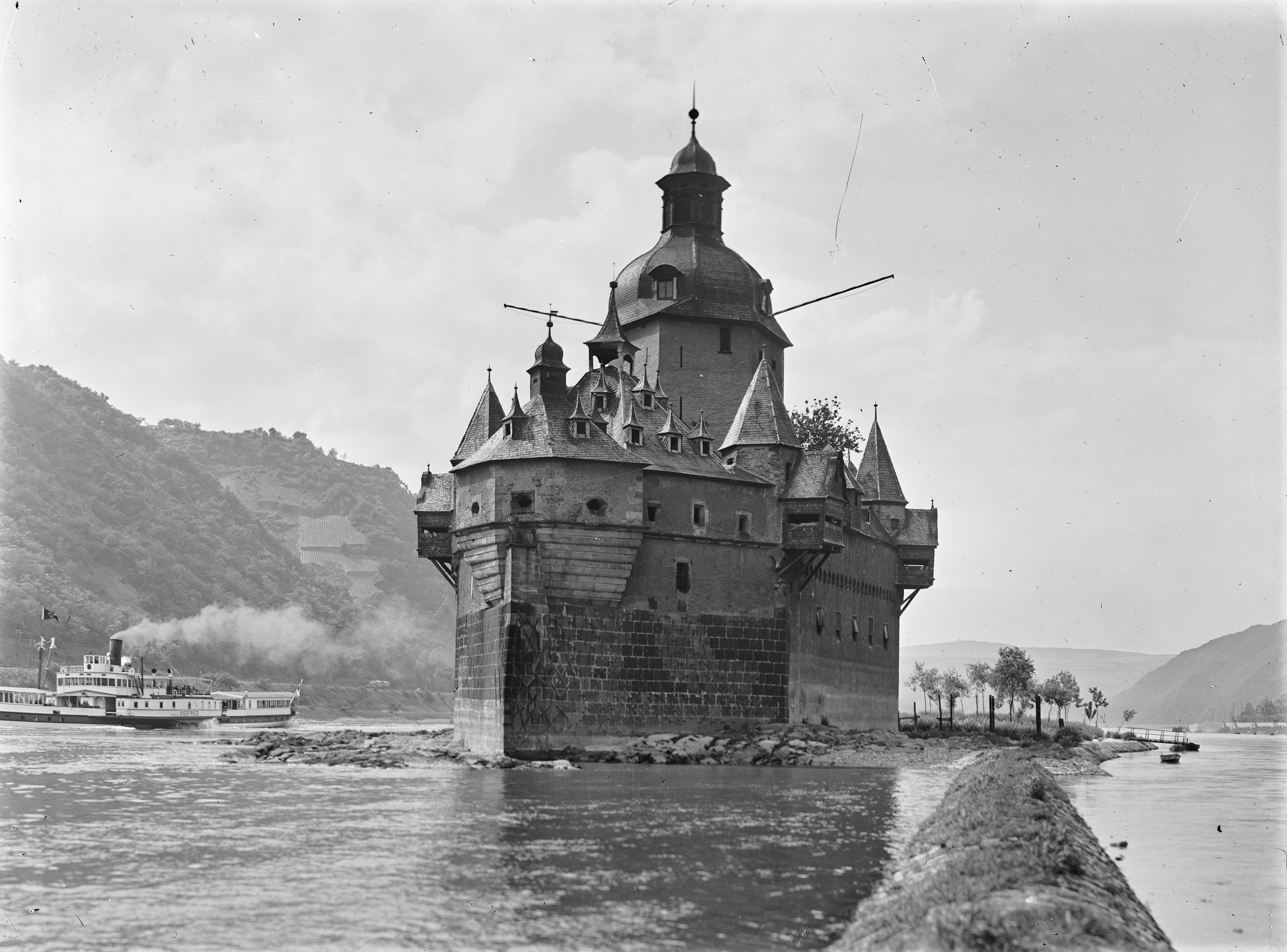
Pfalzgrafenstein Castle photographed in 1931/1943

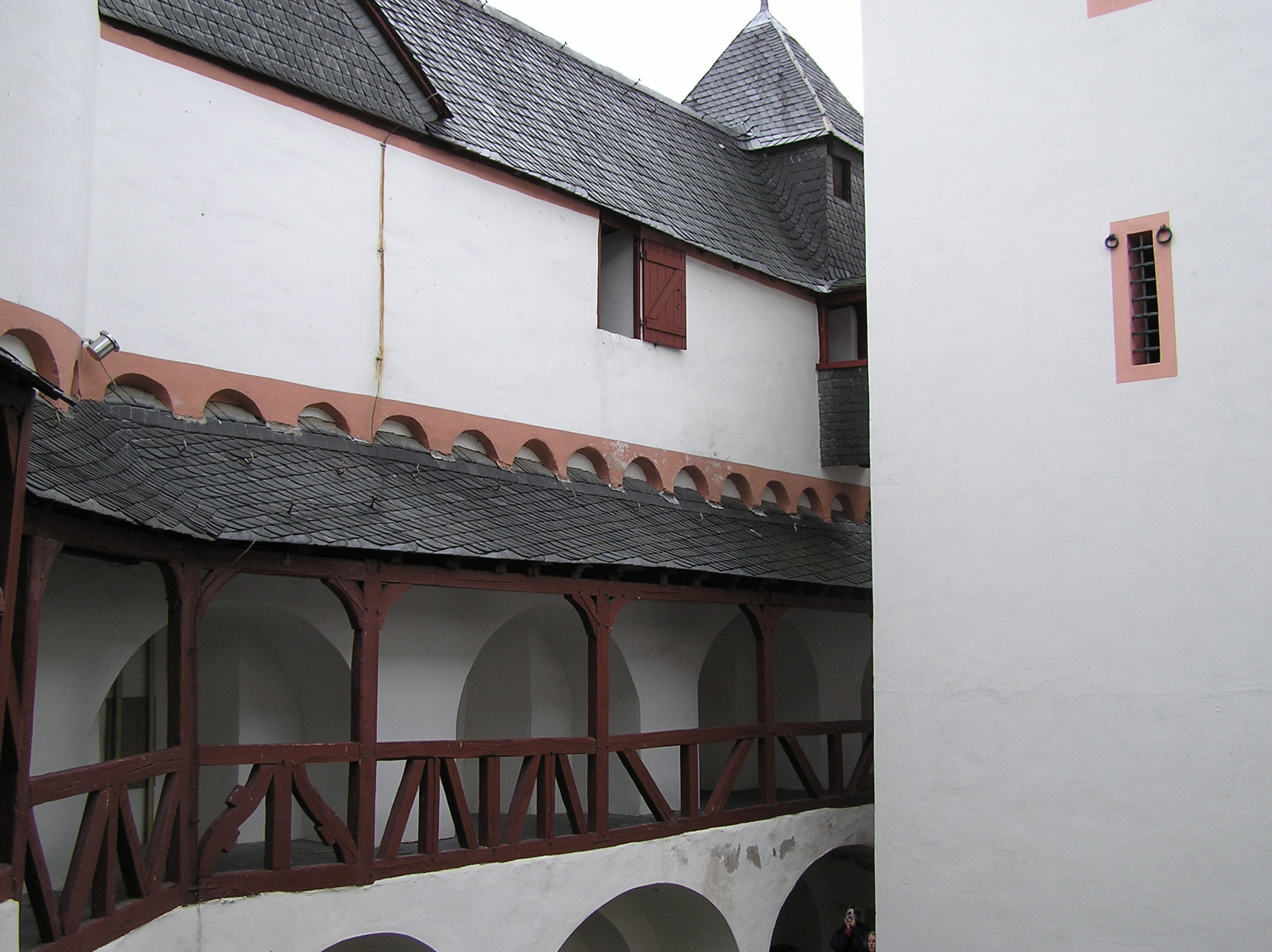
The inner courtyard

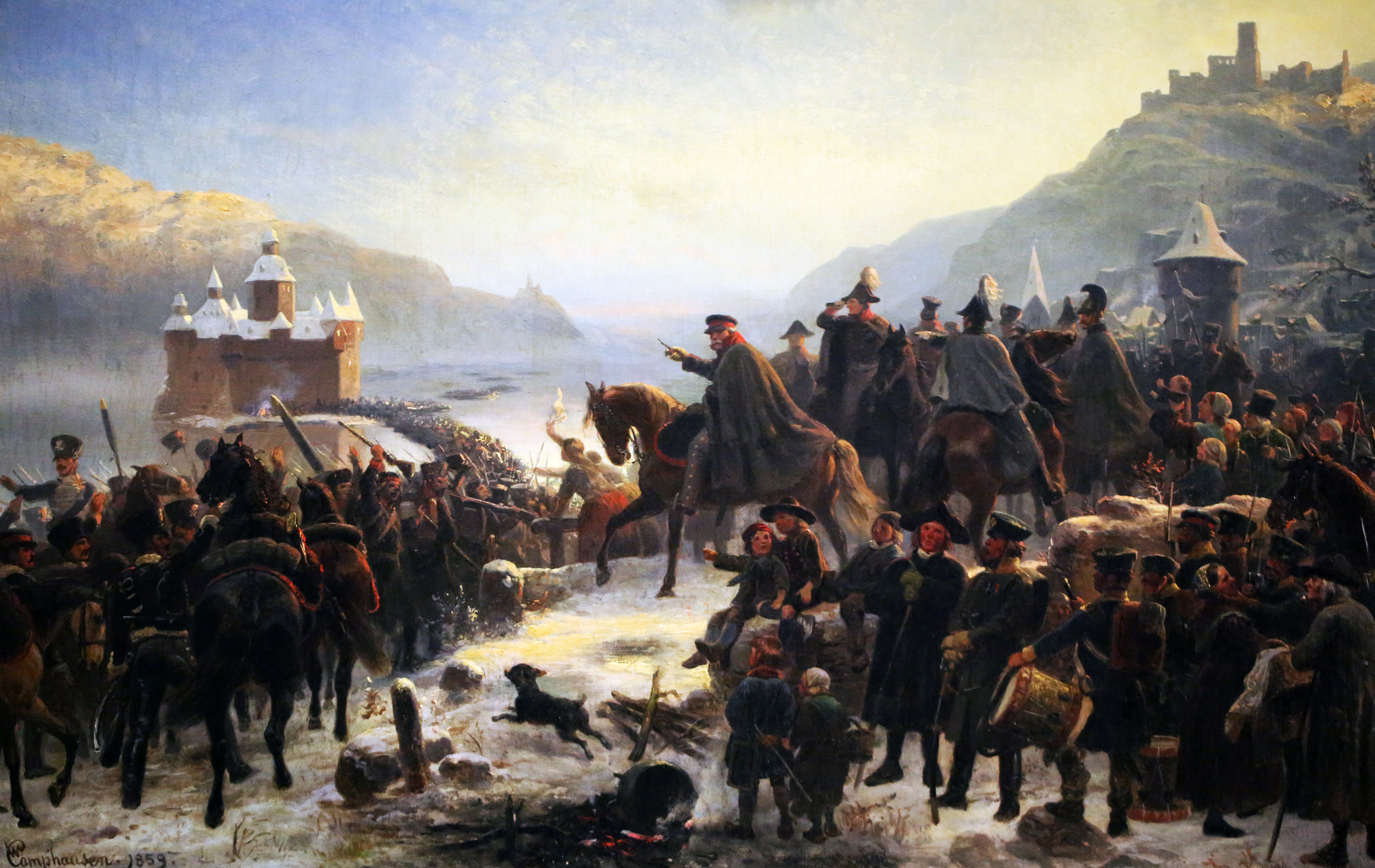
Blücher's Rhine-crossing at Kaub, by Wilhelm Camphausen

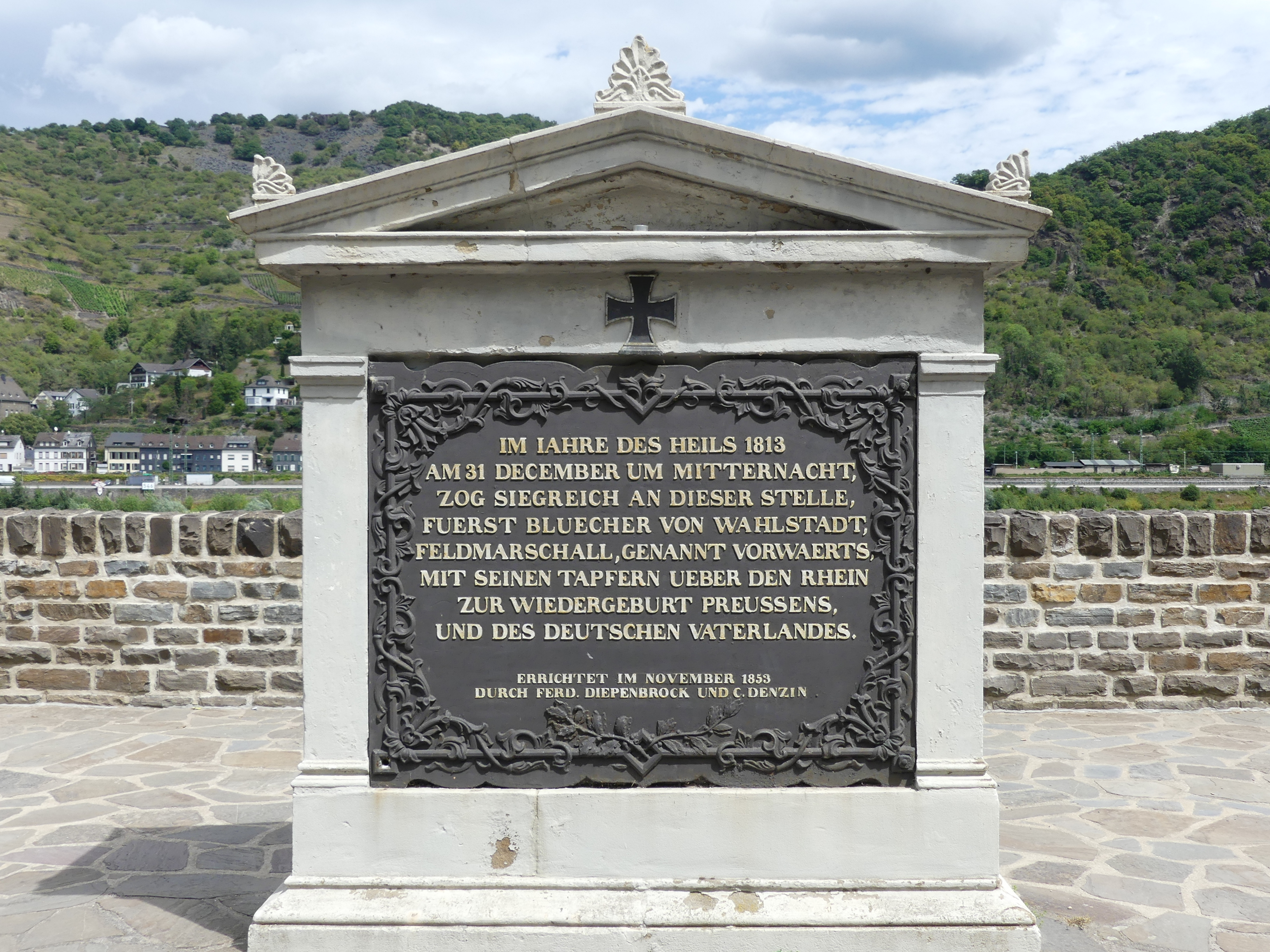
Monument on the bank of the Rhine commemorating the January 1814 crossing of Blücher's forces, erected in 1853
