= Kaub =

- Town
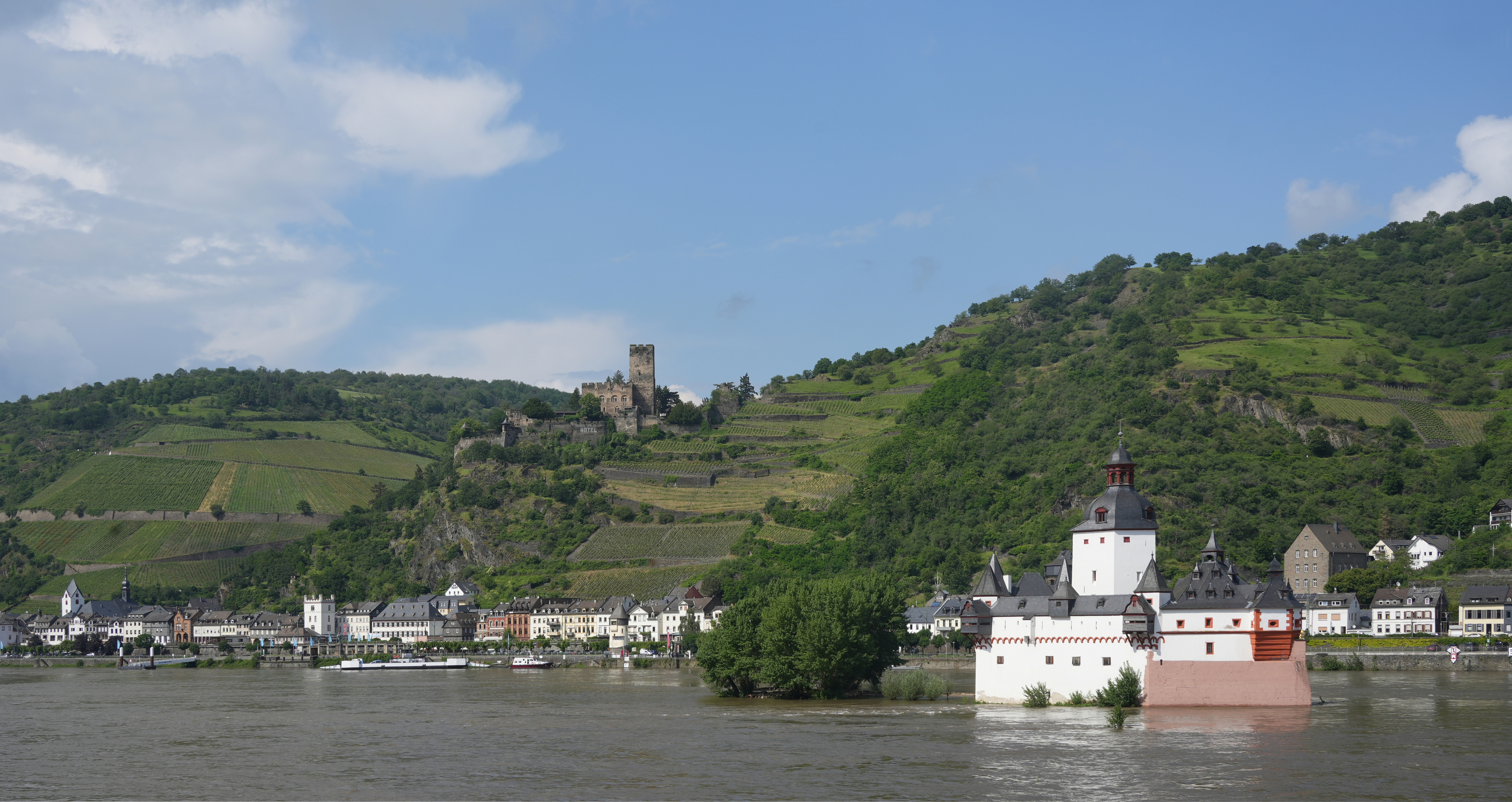
- Kaub

- Coat of arms

- Location of Kaub within Rhein-Lahn-Kreis district
- Interactive map of Kaub
- Location within Germany Location within Rhineland-Palatinate
- Coordinates: 50°5′17″N 7°45′46″E
- Country: Germany
- State: Rhineland-Palatinate
- District: Rhein-Lahn-Kreis
- Municipal assoc.: Loreley

Government
  - Mayor (2019–24): Martin Buschfort

Area
  - Total: 13.05 km^{2} (5.04 sq mi)
- Elevation: 90 m (300 ft)

Population (2025-12-31)
  - Total: 758
  - Density: 58.1/km^{2} (150/sq mi)
- Time zone: UTC+01:00 (CET)
  - Summer (DST): UTC+02:00 (CEST)
- Postal codes: 56349
- Dialling codes: 06774
- Vehicle registration: EMS, DIZ, GOH
- Website: www.kaubamrhein.de

Kaub (German pronunciation: [ˈkaʊp]; old spelling: Caub) is a town in Germany, state Rhineland-Palatinate, district Rhein-Lahn-Kreis. It is part of the municipality (Verbandsgemeinde) Loreley. It is located on the right bank of the Rhine, approx. 50 km west from Wiesbaden. It is connected to Wiesbaden and Koblenz by railway. It has a Roman Catholic and an Evangelical church, and a statue of General Blücher. Historically, trade mainly consisted of the wines of the district.

Kaub is known for the castle Pfalz, or Burg Pfalzgrafenstein, situated on a rock in the middle of the Rhine. According to legend, the Palatine countesses awaited their confinement in the Pfalz, but in reality the castle served as a toll-gate for merchandise on the Rhine. The restored castle Gutenfels sits on a hill above the town.

Kaub, first mentioned in the year 983, originally belonged to the lords of Falkenstein, in 1260 the Counts of Katzenelnbogen divided their county and selected the inhabitants of Kaub, then passed in 1277 to the Rhenish Electorate of the Palatinate, and attained civic rights in 1324. In 1477 Kaub was passed as deposit to the Counts of Katzenelnbogen again. In 1479 this family died out. It was at Kaub that Blücher crossed the Rhine with the Prussian and Russian armies, on New Years night 1813–1814, in pursuit of the French.

== Kaub gauging station ==
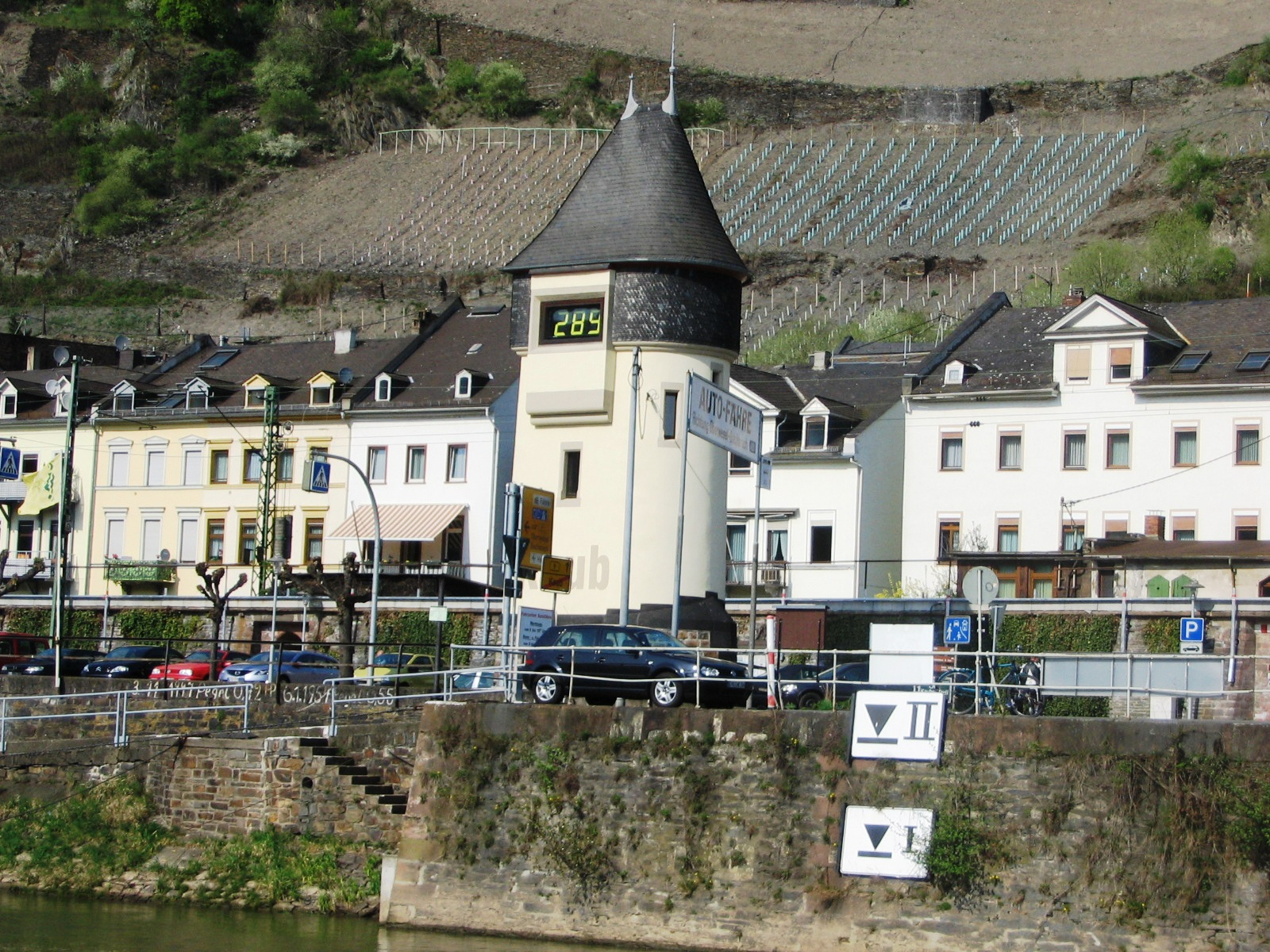
The gauge tower

Kaub is the home of the Kaub gauging station, a "decisive" Rhine water level metering site. Kaub is located at the shallowest part of the Middle Rhine; ships with freight from the ports on the North Sea have to pass Kaub on their way to the southwest of Germany, where a major portion of the German industry is located. Once the level at the gauge passes the 78 cm mark (this is not the actual depth of the river), a low water level threshold is declared. At this level, due to much lower possible load, four time more barges are required to transport the same volume of goods as compared to the high (250 cm) level.

== Mayors ==
The honorary mayor is Martin Buschfort, elected in May 2019. His predecessor was Karl-Heinz Lachmann (SPD), in office between 2009 and 2019. From 1989 to 2009 Heribert Werr (KBL) was the mayor. Lachmann was reelected in 2014.

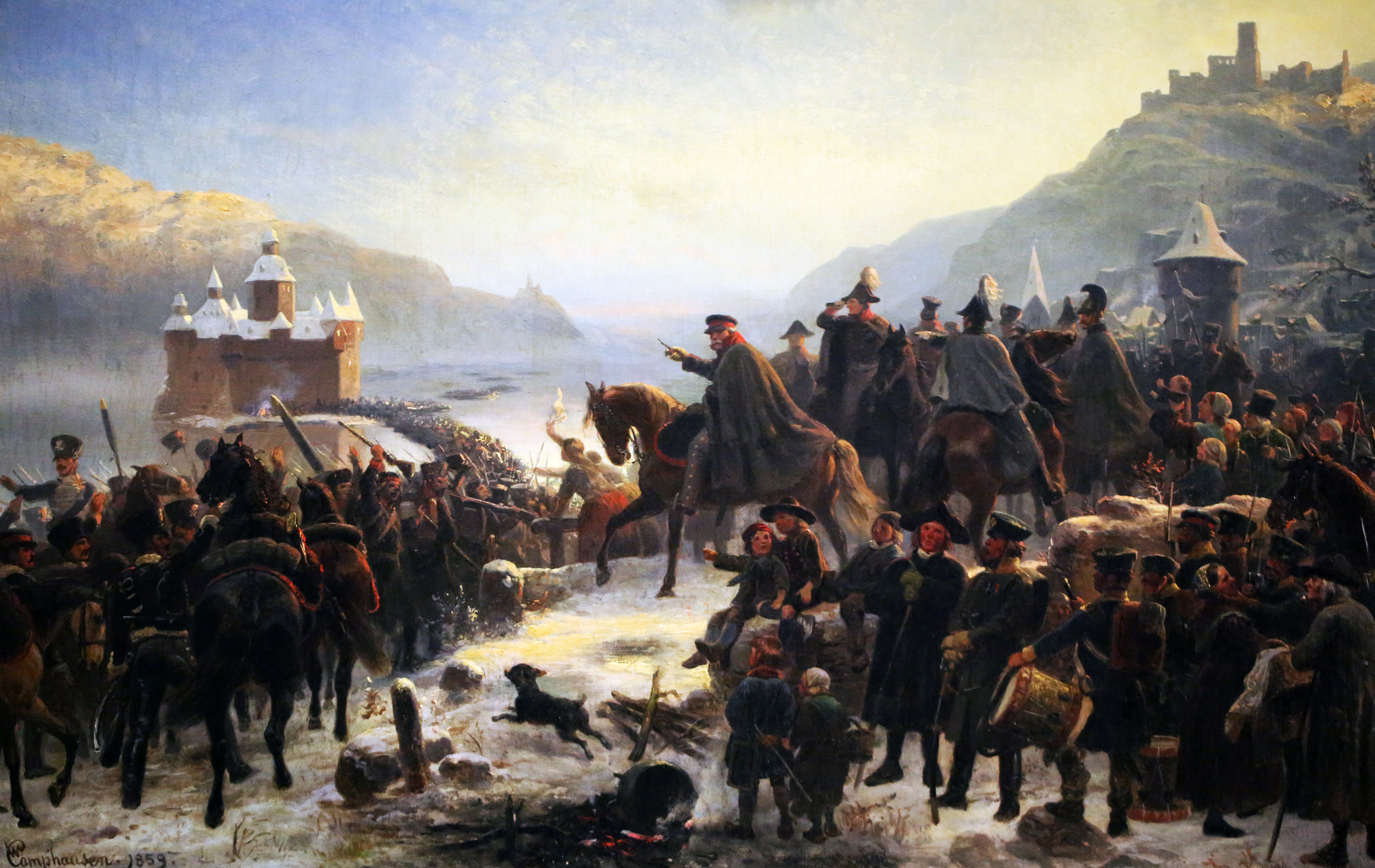
Blücher's Rhine-crossing at Kaub, by Wilhelm Camphausen

Kaub was part of the temporary state Free State of Bottleneck (German: Freistaat Flaschenhals) from 1919 to 1923.

== Gallery ==
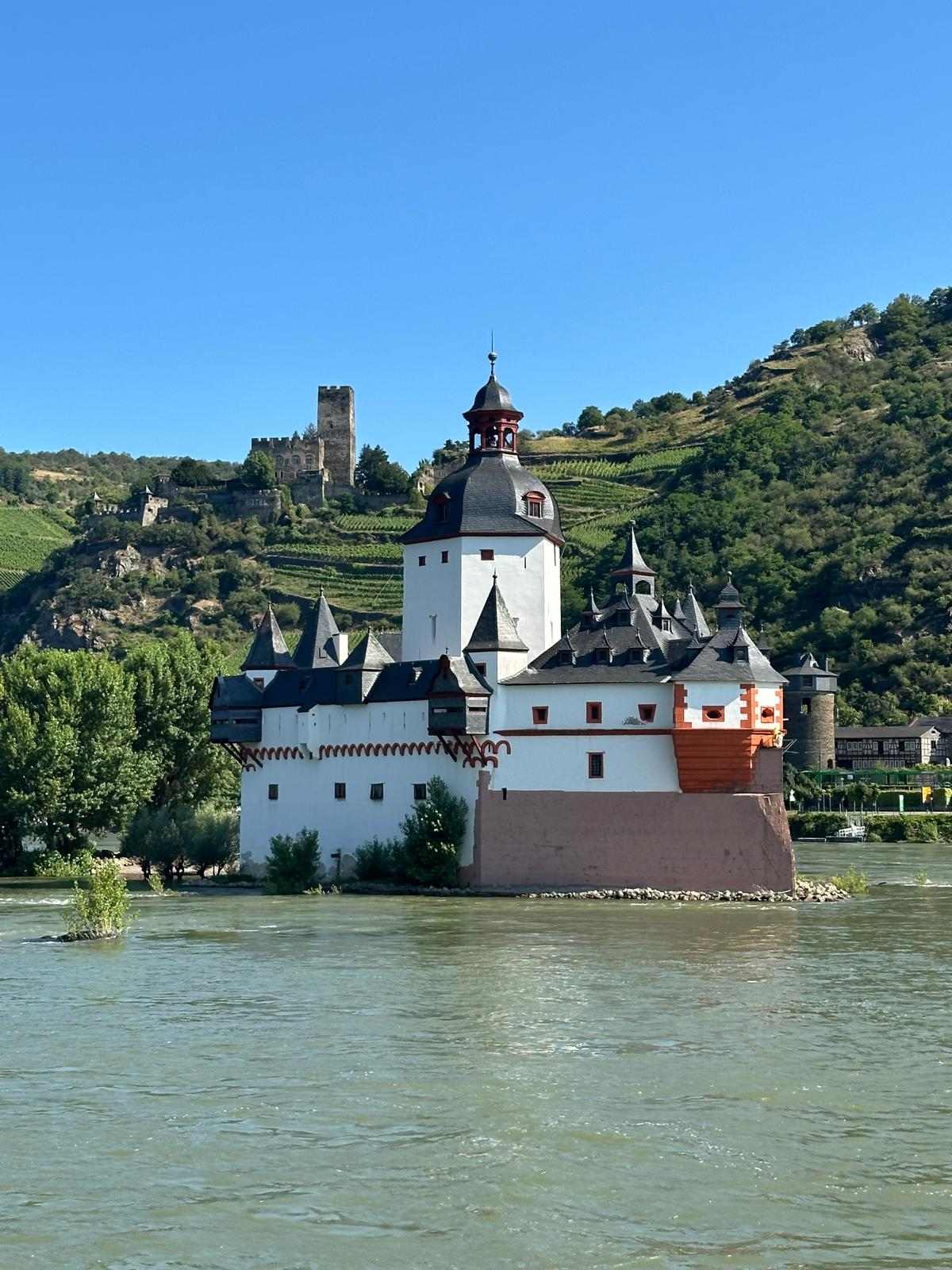
Burg Pfalzgrafenstein and Burg Gutenfels with Kaub

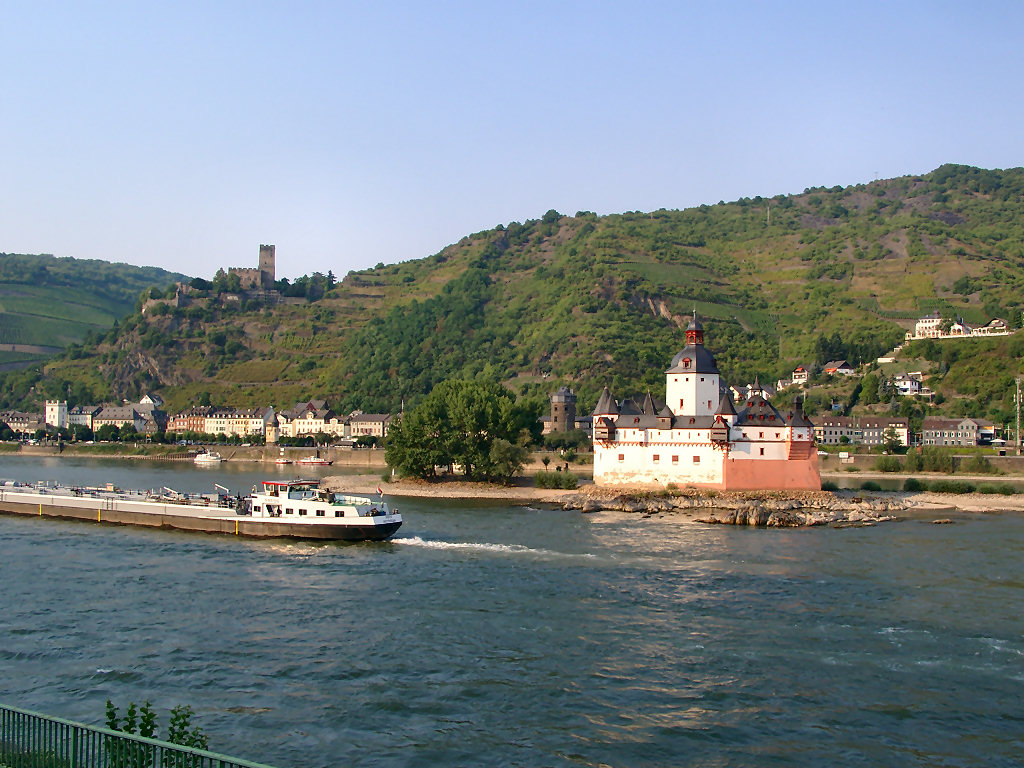
Kaub, with the castles Pfalzgrafenstein and Burg Gutenfels

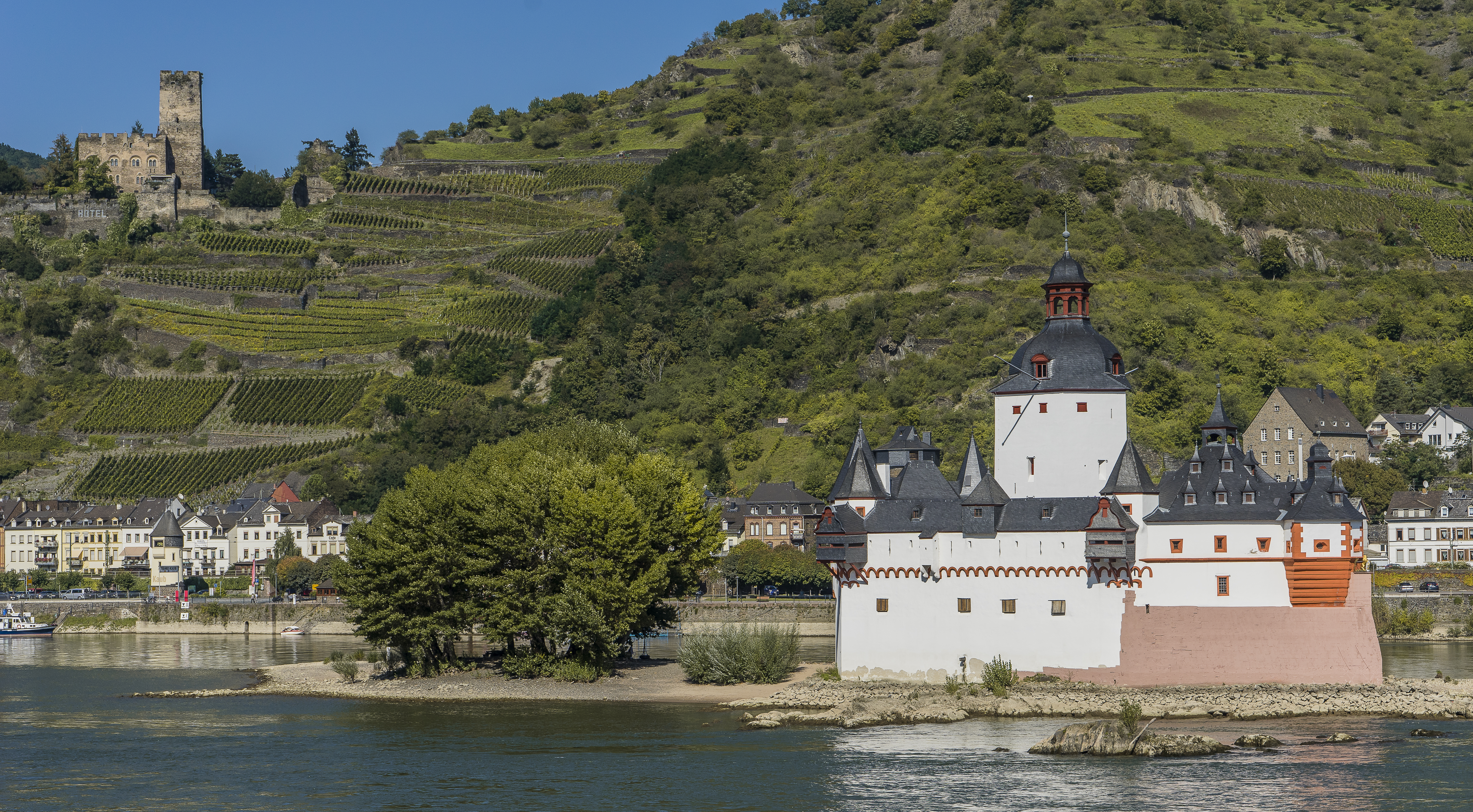
Castles Pfalzgrafenstein & Gutenfels

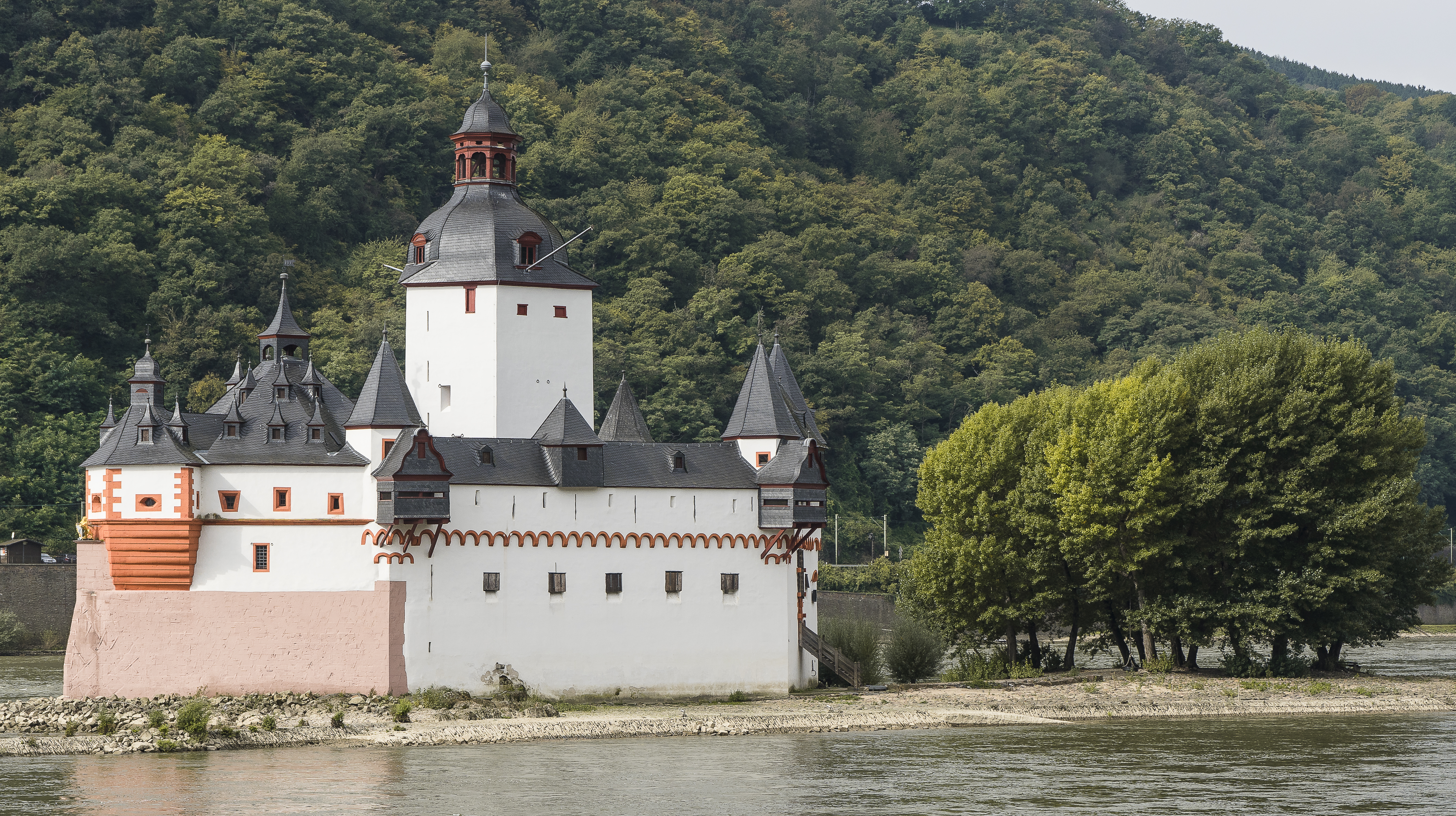
Castle Pfalzgrafenstein

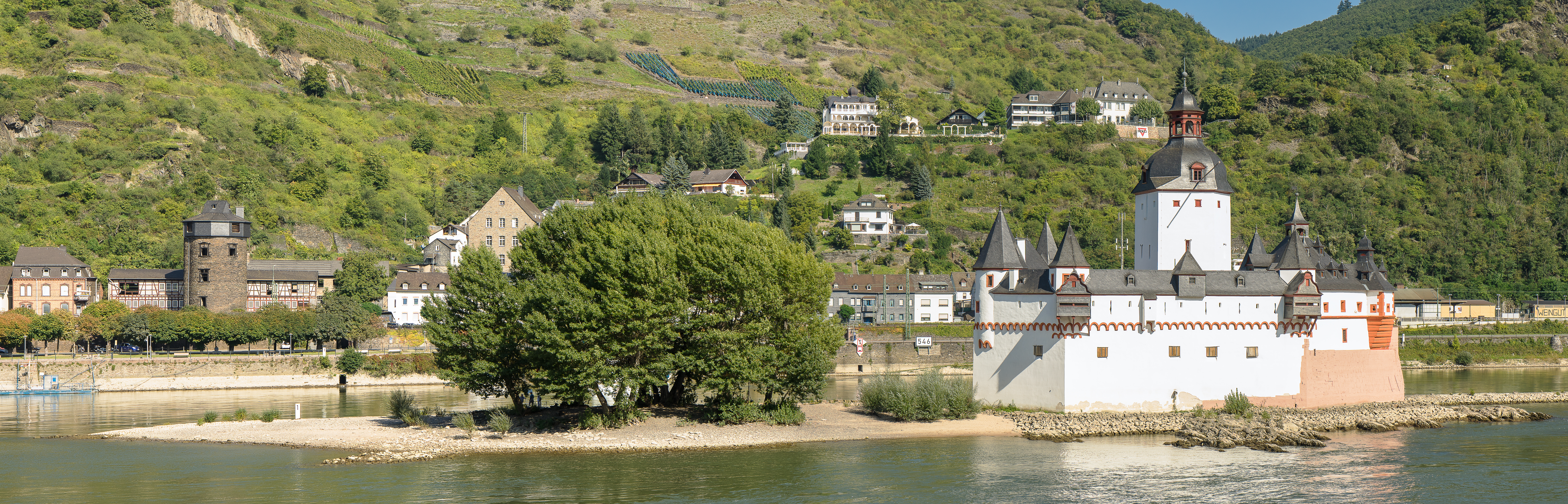
Kaub & Castle Pfalzgrafenstein

== Notes and references ==
- Picture of Pfalzgrafenstein, J.F. Dielmann, A. Fay, J. Becker (painter): F.C. Vogels Panorama des Rheins, Bilder des rechten und linken Rheinufers, Lithographische Anstalt F.C. Vogel, Frankfurt 1833
- Picture of Kaub, J.F. Dielmann, A. Fay, J. Becker (painter): F.C. Vogels Panorama des Rheins, Bilder des rechten und linken Rheinufers, Lithographische Anstalt F.C. Vogel, Frankfurt 1833
- Picture 2 of Kaub, J.F. Dielmann, A. Fay, J. Becker (painter): F.C. Vogels Panorama des Rheins, Bilder des rechten und linken Rheinufers, Lithographische Anstalt F.C. Vogel, Frankfurt 1833
