= Gutenfels Castle =

Castle above Kaub, Germany

- Burg Gutenfels
- Kaub
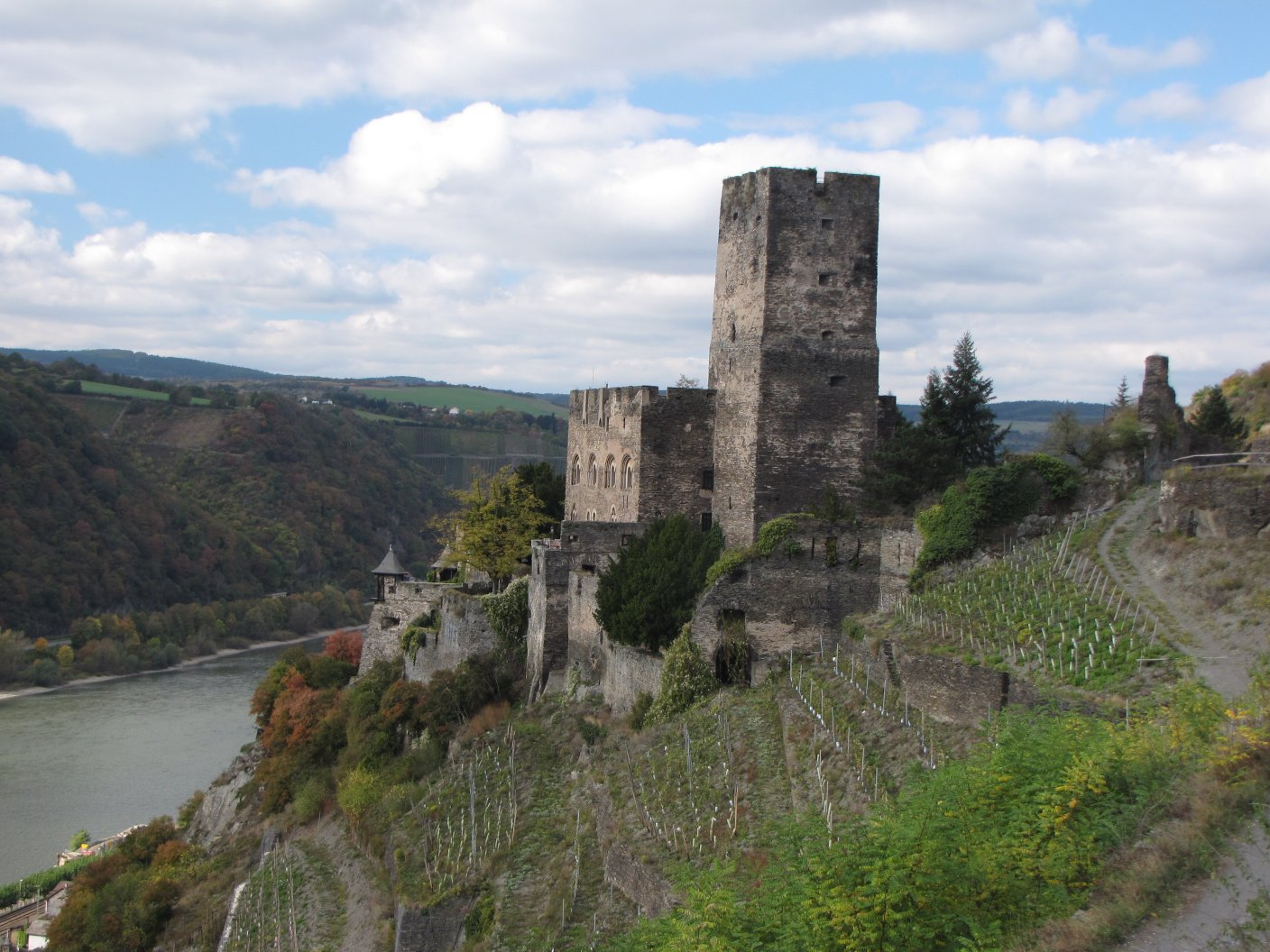

Site information
- Type: Medieval castle

Location
- Coordinates: 50°5′16.1″N 7°45′56.2″E

Site history
- Built: 1220

Gutenfels Castle (German: Burg Gutenfels), historically known as Caub Castle or Kaub Castle, is a castle located 110m above the town of Kaub in Rhineland-Palatinate, Germany.

== History ==
Gutenfels Castle was built in 1220. It first appears in historical documents in 1257 owned by the Falkenstein family. The castle along with the fortified town of Kaub became part of the Electorate of the Palatinate in 1277. Gutenfels Castle worked alongside Pfalzgrafenstein Castle in the middle of the Rhine and Kaub on the opposite bank to control the waterway and collect tolls for the Holy Roman Emperor. It has been known as Gutenfels Castle since being unsuccessfully besieged in 1504 by Landgrave William II of Hesse as part of the War of the Succession of Landshut.

In 1793 Gutenfels Castle was garrisoned by several companies of Palatine veterans when it surrendered relatively intact to French revolutionary forces. In 1803 it passed to the Duchy of Nassau with the dissolution of the Holy Roman Empire. The Nassau government planned to utilise the castle as a workhouse and prison however were ordered by Napoleon in 1806 to dismantle and disarm it. The castle was partially demolished between 1805 and 1807. Weapons and artifacts were distributed to nearby castles, the moat was filled in and walls were sold for stone in late 1807.

Prussia purchased the area in 1866 and ended this toll in 1867.

The castle was rebuilt between 1889 and 1892.

The castle is part of the Rhine Gorge, a UNESCO World Heritage Site added in 2002. The castle transitioned from a hotel into private ownership in 2006.

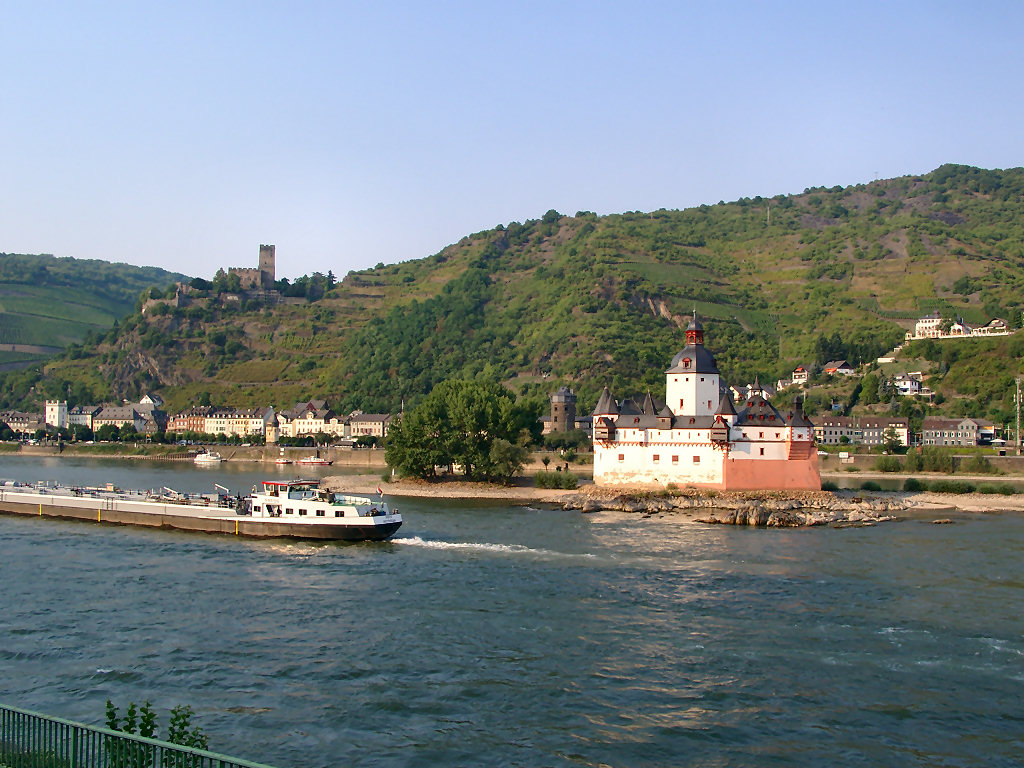
Kaub, with the castles of Pfalzgrafenstein and Gutenfels
