= Contargo =

Logistics service provider

Contargo GmbH & Co. KG
- Type: GmbH & Co. KG
- Industry: Container logistics
- Headquarters: Duisburg, Germany
- Key people: Thomas Loeffler (Managing Director); Juergen Albersmann (Managing Director); Marcel Hulsker (Managing Director)
- Revenue: 566 million EUR (2021)
- Number of employees: 1200 (2021)
- Website: www.contargo.net

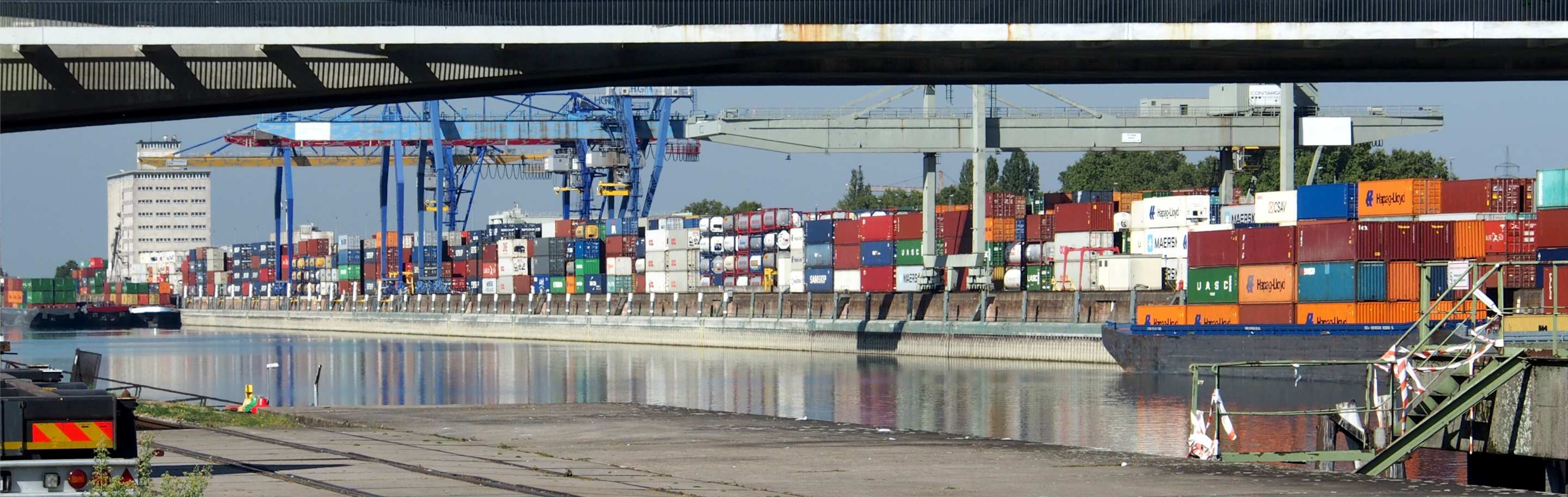
Container terminal in the Port of Mannheim taken over from Wincanton

Contargo GmbH & Co. KG is an internationally active logistics service provider performing trimodal transport between the seaports and the European hinterland and providing all auxiliary services, such as empty container depots and repairs. Contargo transports 2.1 million TEU annually in its network (24 terminals, four inland shipping lines and several rail lines) along the Rhine and its main tributaries up to Switzerland.

== History ==
Contargo was founded in 2004, bundling the activities of various enterprises in container hinterland logistics, some of which had been active since 1976 in combined transport by barge and truck and the operation of container terminals.

- 2004 start of operations at the Ludwigshafen Terminal in the Kaiserwörthhafen
- 2004 Participation in rail operator NeCoSS, extending Contargo's interest to include container rail transport.
- 2006 Takeover of the activities of barge operator Interfeeder Ducotra B.V. in Dordrecht, NL
- 2008 April: Combined Service GmbH & Co. KG (CCS) and Interfeeder B.V. merged to form Contargo B.V.
- 2008 August: 100% takeover of Contargo Container Escaut Service (CCES)
- 2009 February: Service Point opened in Tokyo, Japan
- 2011 January: Contargo Alpina AG, Basel and BMT Basel Multi Terminal AG merged to form Contargo AG
- 2011 November: Contargo takes over the Pöhland Group with six subsidiaries
- 2011 December: activities at the Aschaffenburg terminal discontinued and transferred to Frankfurt
- 2012 January: Contargo takes over six Wincanton terminals
- 2012 March: Contargo Koblenz GmbH renamed Contargo Rhein-Main GmbH
- 2012 May: full takeover of Rhinecontainer (purchase of remaining shares from Kühne & Nagel)
- 2012 September: Mainz terminal closed and moved to Gustavsburg
- 2012 October: integration of the Karlsruhe and Wörth terminals to form Contargo Wörth-Karlsruhe GmbH, inclusion of the Ludwigshafen and Mannheim terminals in Contargo Rhein-Neckar GmbH, extension of Contargo Rhein-Main GmbH to include the terminals Gustavsburg and Frankfurt-Ost
- 2012 December: following the takeover of inland barge operator Rhinecontainer B.V. and Transbox B.V. these are integrated into Contargo B.V. The new shipping company operates as Contargo Waterway Logistics
- 2013 January: with effect from 1 January Contargo gives up its 49.8 percent share in rail operator NeCoSS and now operates its own container rail link Hamburg – Hof
- 2013 December: Contargo takes over Neuss Intermodal Terminal GmbH (NIT) from APM-Terminals (APMT) and changes its name to Contargo Neuss GmbH [4]
- 2014 September: The Contargo terminal site in Germersheim, previously a branch office of Contargo Network Service GmbH & Co. KG, is affiliated to Contargo Rhein-Neckar GmbH.
- 2014 September: at the end of the month Contargo sells its share of Neuss Trimodal GmbH, Neuss, Germany.
- 2014 October: Transbox United BVBA (a joint venture of Contargo subsidiary Transbox and United Container Transport), with its headquarters in Antwerp, commences operations.
- 2014 December: Contargo Container Escaut Service becomes Contargo North France SAS, with its headquarters in Bruay-sur-l'Escaut.
- 2015 January: Contargo North France becomes the operator of the Escaut Valenciennes Terminal in the town of Bruay-sur-l'Escaut.
- 2015 May: Contargo receives Eco Performance Award
- 2016 March: NYK Line awards Contargo with its Environment Prize "Captain Eco 2015"
- 2016 July: Contargo founds Contargo Rail Services GmbH
- 2017 January: Terminal in Germersheim no longer operated by Contargo
- 2017 January: Contargo increases its participation in the Rhein-Waal Terminal in Emmerich and renames it “Contargo Rhein-Waal-Lippe GmbH”, in conjunction with the as yet unopened terminal in Voerde-Emmelsum
- 2017 January: Contargo Road Logistics also offers direct trucking based on Hamburg

== Services ==
- Terminals: Contargo operates a network of hinterland terminals and transport lines along the Rhine and its main tributaries up to Switzerland, also using canals. The western seaports of Amsterdam, Antwerp, Rotterdam and Zeebrügge are the major interfaces for European imports and exports. Contargo's multimodal network of hinterland terminals links up primarily with these, but the northern seaports of Hamburg, Bremen and Bremerhaven are integrated into the container logistics network via rail links, and the north-western French terminals of Prouvy and Saint Saulve via inland waterways.
- Transport services: transport of containers by barge, rail and truck

Heavy load transports and special transports

- Repair services
- Sale and hire of containers

== Environment ==
- Dangerous goods

The Terminals in Ludwigshafen (Contargo Rhein-Neckar GmbH) and Frankfurt (Contargo Industriepark Frankfurt-Höchst GmbH) are equipped for the interim storage of dangerous goods containers. In Basel, in-transit storage is possible for several days.

- IMTIS

Contargo has developed its own free Tariff Information System (IMTIS) which calculates routes and transport prices in combined transport modes, compares different possible routes and gives the CO_{2} consumption for each option.

- Sustainability Report

In 2014 the Contargo Group produced its first Sustainability Report.

- Award

In May 2015 Contargo received the Eco Performance Award. The enterprise particularly impressed the jury of experts by its tariff calculator IMTIS and its economically, ecologically and socially credible sustainability concept. The Eco Performance Award is conferred by DKV Euro Service as an independent seal of quality.

== Subsidiaries and holdings ==
- Contargo Wörth-Karlsruhe GmbH, Karlsruhe, Wörth, Germany
- Contargo Waterway Logistics B.V., Zwijndrecht, Netherlands
- Contargo Rhein-Neckar GmbH, Ludwigshafen, Mannheim, Germany
- Contargo Rhein-Main GmbH, Koblenz, Frankfurt, Gustavsburg, Germany
- Contargo Sàrl, Ottmarsheim and Strasbourg, France
- Contargo AG, Basel, Switzerland
- Contargo North France SAS, Prouvy, Saint-Saulve and Bruay-sur-l'Escaut, France
- Contargo Network Service GmbH & Co. KG, Zwijndrecht, Netherlands
- DIT Duisburg Intermodal Terminal GmbH, Duisburg, Germany
- Contargo Industriepark Frankfurt-Hoechst GmbH, Frankfurt, Germany
- Rhein Waal Terminal GmbH, Emmerich, Germany
- NWL Norddeutsche Wasserweg Logistik GmbH, Bremen, Germany
- Container Terminal Dortmund GmbH, Dortmund, Germany
- Contargo Road Logistics B.V., Zwijndrecht, Netherlands and Hamburg, Germany
- Contargo Neuss GmbH, Neuss, Germany
- Contargo Network Logistics GmbH, Hof, Döhlau, Luhe, Glauchau, Hamburg, Germany, Plzeň, Czech Republic
- Transbox United BVBA, Antwerp, Belgium
- Contargo Weil am Rhein, Weil am Rhein, Germany
- Contargo Rail Services GmbH, Mannheim, Germany

== Shareholder ==
Rhenus AG & Co. KG
