= Wilhelm Camphausen =

German painter (1818–1885)

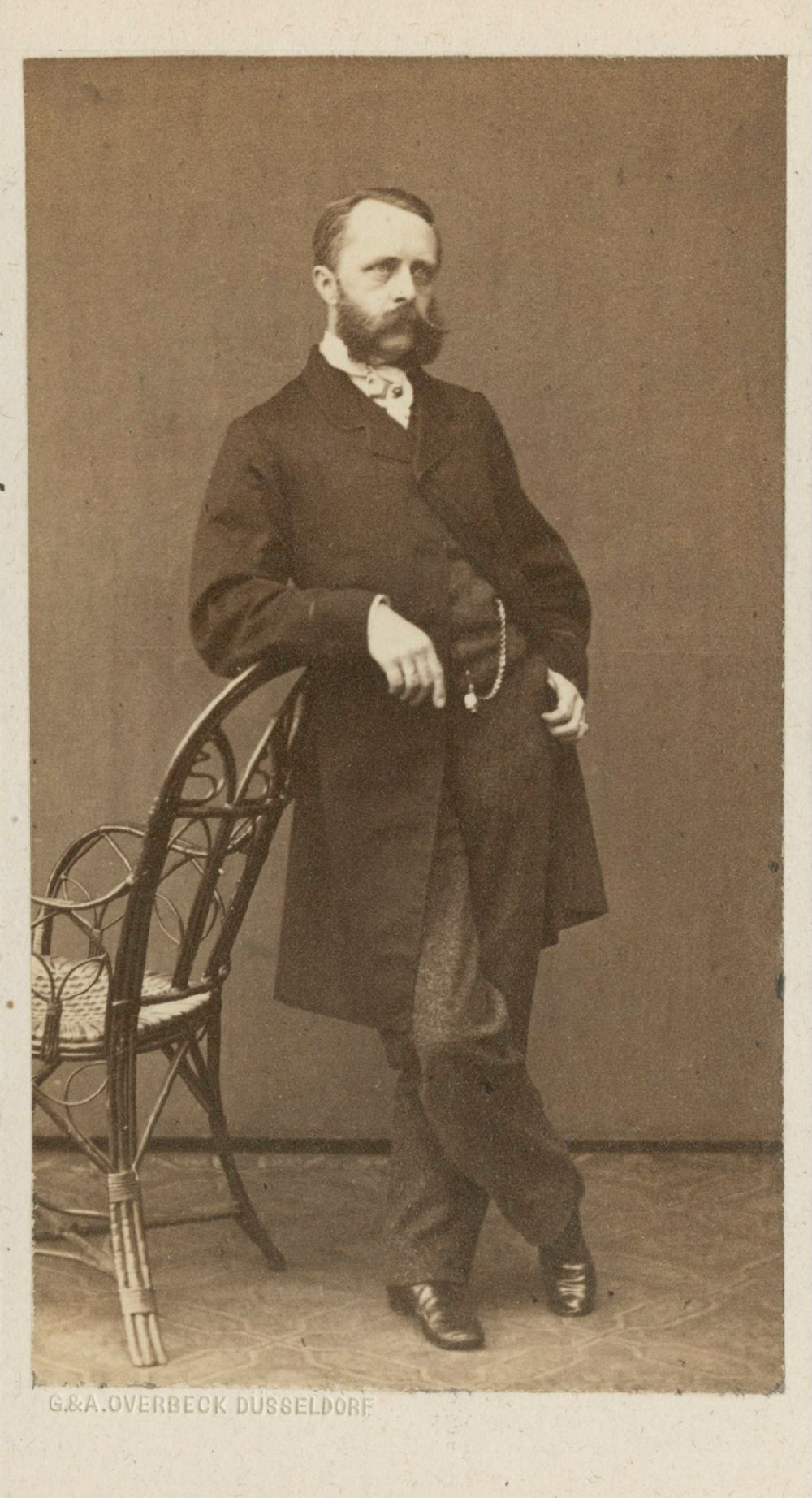
c. 1868 photograph of Camphausen

Wilhelm Camphausen (8 February 1818 – 16 June 1885) was a German painter who specialised in history painting and military art.

== Biography ==
He studied under Alfred Rethel and Friedrich Wilhelm Schadow. As an historical and battle painter he rapidly became popular, and in 1859 was made professor of painting at the Düsseldorf Academy, together with other later distinctions. His Flight of Tilly (1841), Prince Eugene of Savoy at the Battle of Belgrade (1843; in the Cologne Museum), Flight of Charles II after the Battle of Worcester (Berlin National Gallery), Cromwell's Cavalry (Munich Pinakothek), are his principal earlier pictures; and his Frederick the Great at Potsdam, Frederick II and the Bayreuth Dragoons at Hohenfriedburg. He is associated with the Düsseldorf school of painting.

In 1864, he accompanied the Prussian forces during the Schleswig-Holstein campaign and painted several scenes of the fighting as well as scenes of the War of 1866 (notably Lines of Dybbøl after the Battle, at the Berlin National Gallery), made him famous in Germany as a representative of patriotic historical art. He also painted many portraits of German princes and celebrated soldiers and statesmen. In the 1870 Franco-Prussian War Camphausen served in the German army as an official war artist.

== Works By ==
- Camphausen, Wilhelm (1865). Ein Maler auf dem Kriegsfelde: illustrirtes Tagebuch. Bielefeld: Velhagen und Klasing.
- Camphausen, Wilhelm (1880). Vaterländische Reiterbilder aus drei Jahrhunderten von W. Camphausen; text von Theodor Fontane; Illustrationen des Textes gezeichnet von L. Burger. Berlin: R. Schuster.

== See also ==
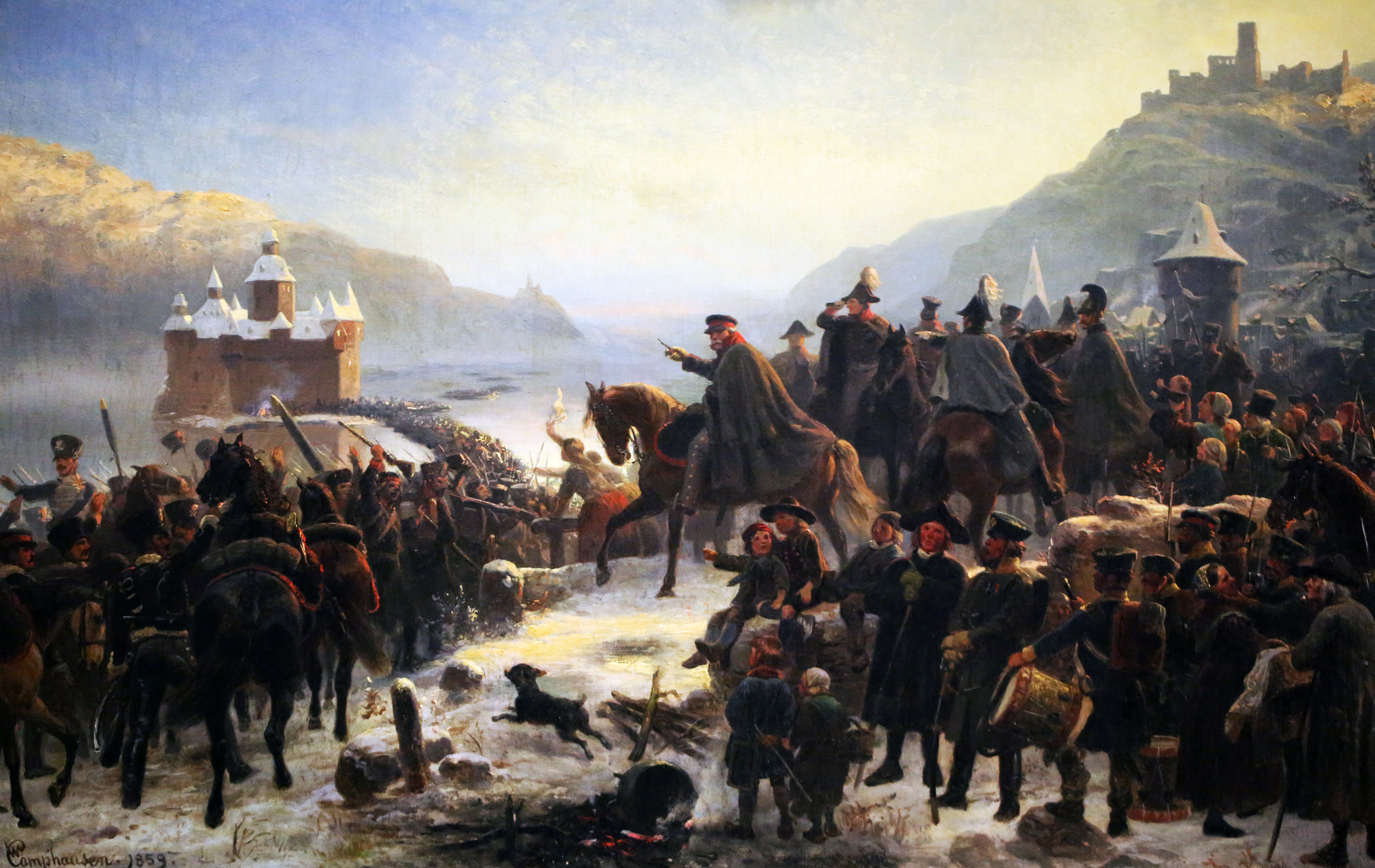
General von Blücher Crossing the Rhine

- List of German painters
