= Koblenz Fortress =

Coordinates: 50°21′N 7°36′E

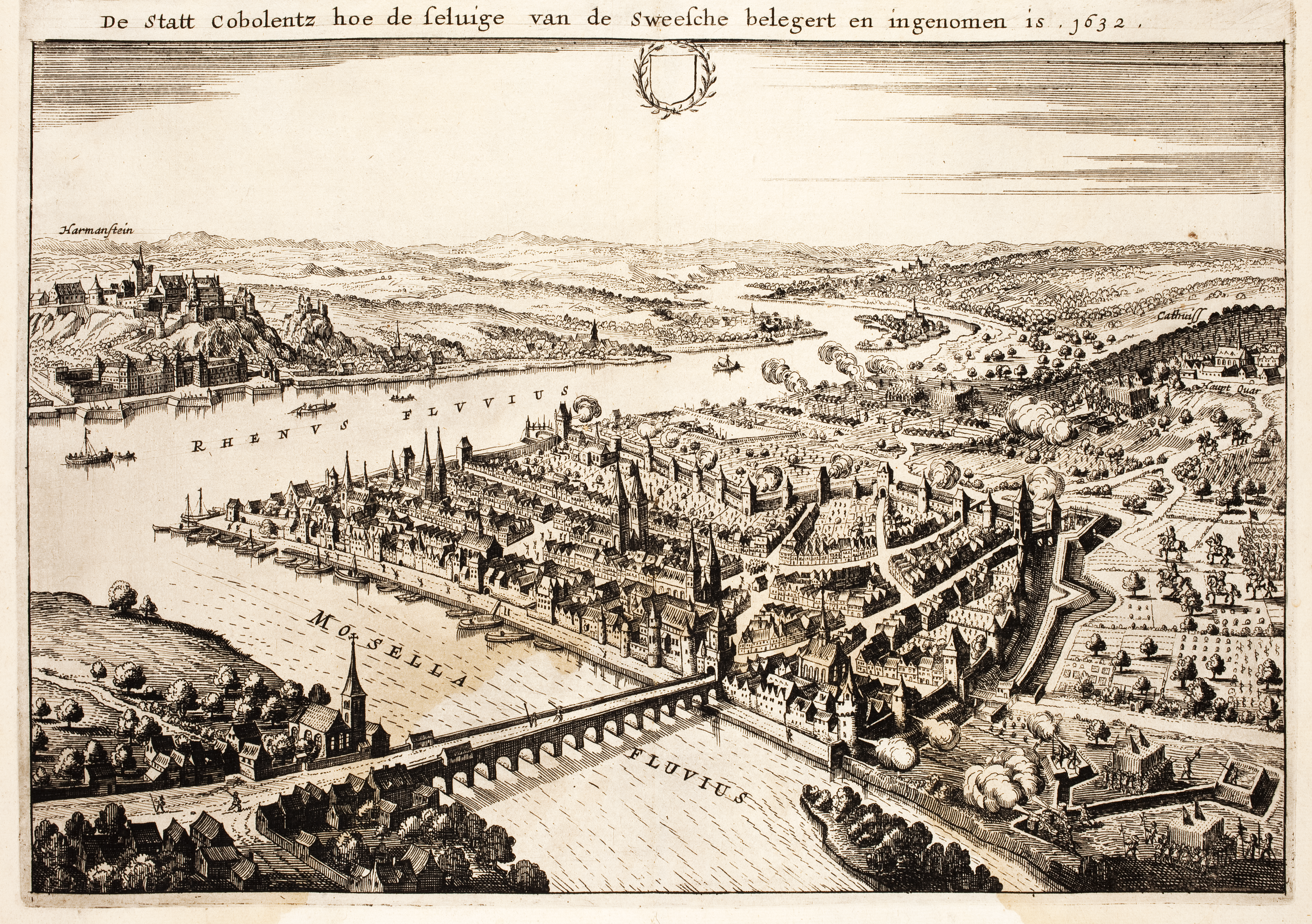
Siege of the city of Koblenz in 1632

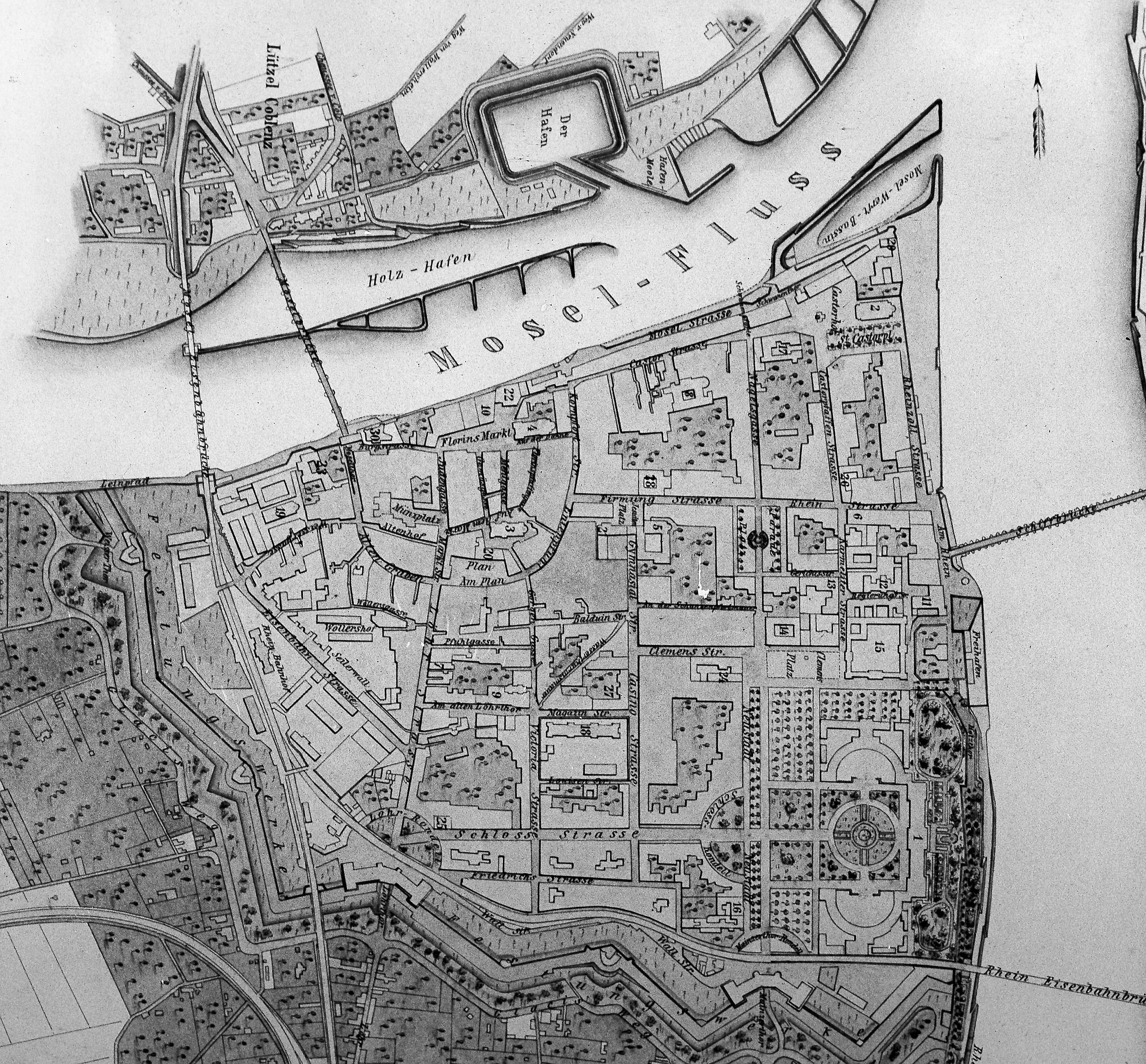
Map of Koblenz from 1888

Koblenz Fortress was part of a Prussian fortress system near the city of Koblenz in Germany which consisted of the city fortifications of Koblenz and Ehrenbreitstein and exterior supporting constructions such as entrenchments and forts. Koblenz fortress was built in three stages: 1815–1830, 1859–1868 and 1871–1886. The designers were: Ernst von Aster and Gustav von Rauch. Individual parts of the fortification have been preserved; other parts were demolished over the course of time. For example, in 1890 part of the fortress was declassified, the gates were demolished between 1896 and 1899 and further structures were demolished in the years 1920–1927.

== See also ==
- Ehrenbreitstein Fortress
