= Ehrenbreitstein Fortress =

- Festung Ehrenbreitstein
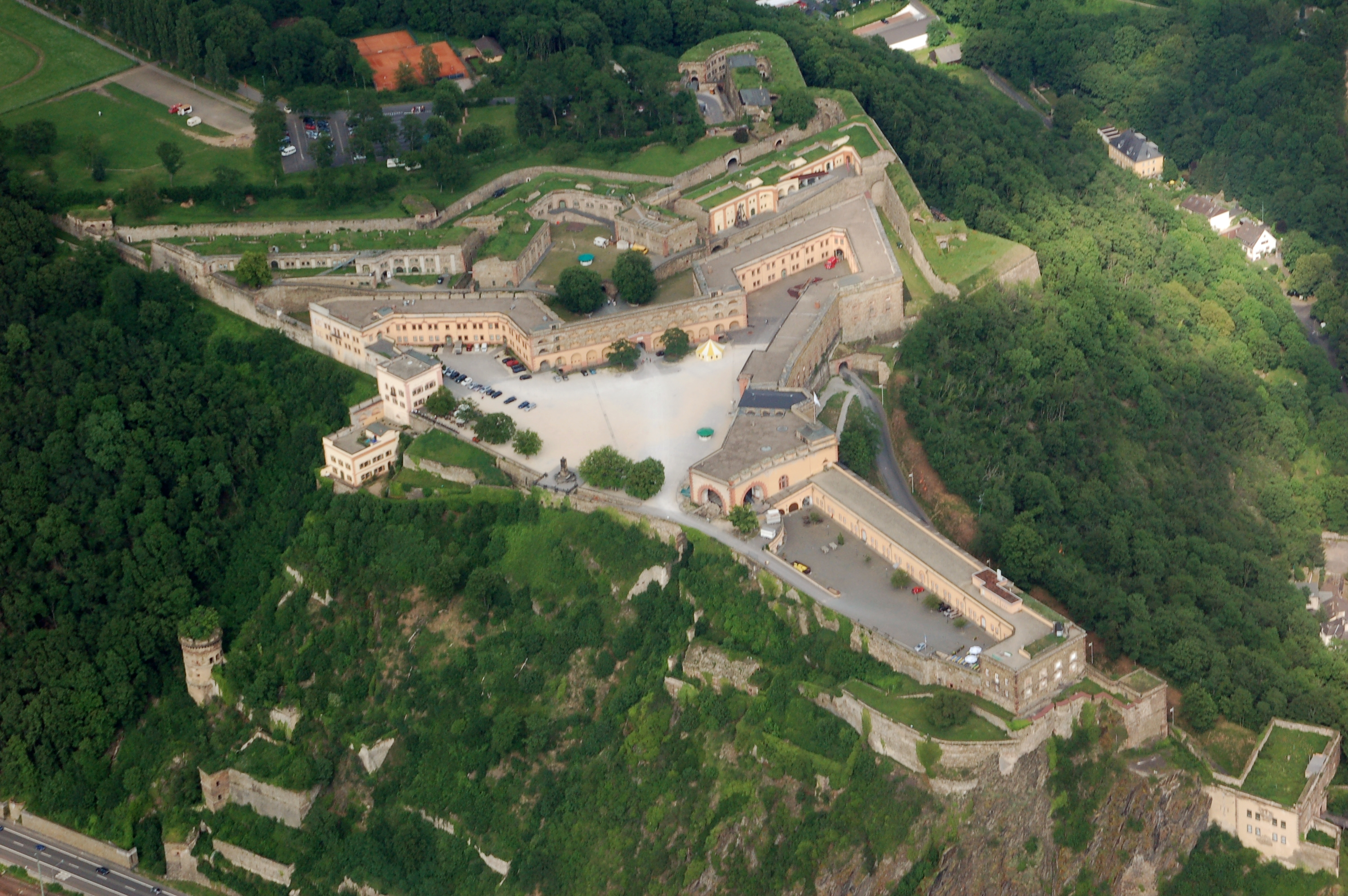
- Aerial view

- Location within Rhineland-Palatinate Location within Germany

General information
- Type: Fortress
- Location: Koblenz, Germany
- Coordinates: 50.365°N 7.615°E

UNESCO World Heritage Site
- Part of: Upper Middle Rhine Valley
- Criteria: Cultural: (ii)(iv)(v)
- Reference: 1066
- Inscription: 2002 (26th Session)

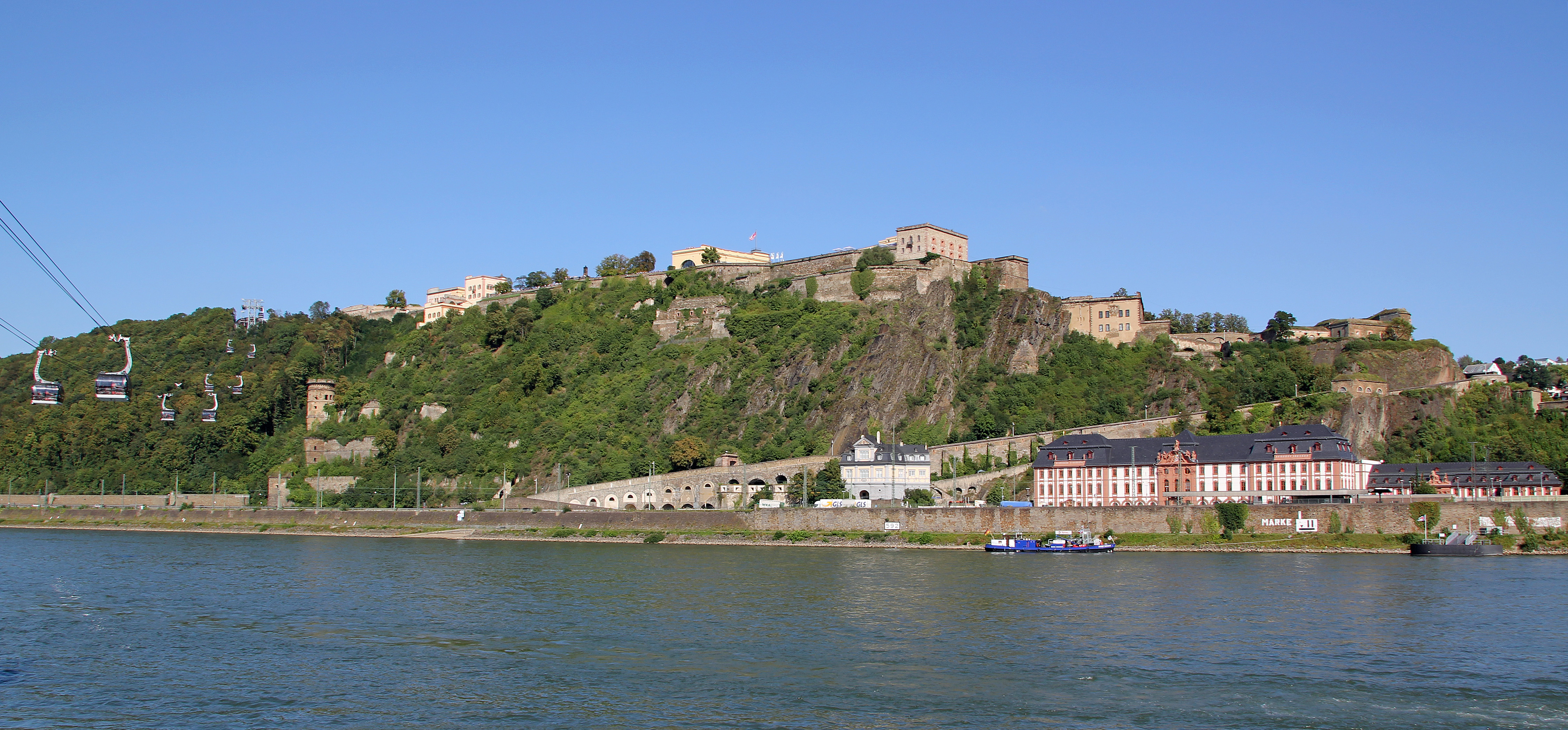
Festung Ehrenbreitstein viewed from Koblenz (2011)

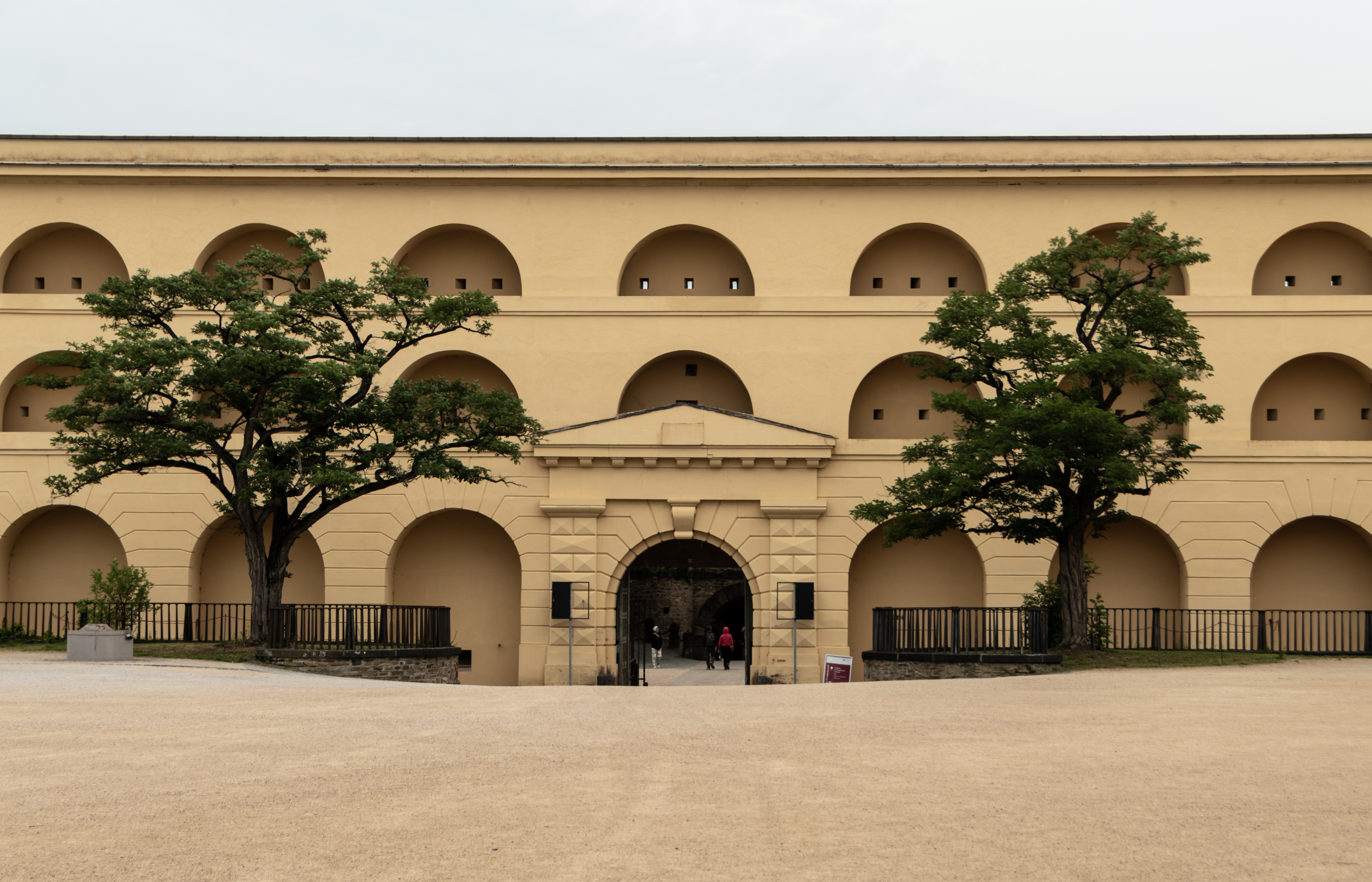
An entrance to the fortress

Ehrenbreitstein Fortress (German: Festung Ehrenbreitstein, pronounced [ˌfɛstʊŋ eːʁənˈbʁaɪtʃtaɪn]), a fortress in the German state of Rhineland-Palatinate, stands on the east bank of the Rhine opposite the mouth of the Moselle, and overlooks the city of Koblenz.

Occupying the position of an earlier fortress destroyed by the French in 1801, it was built as the backbone of the regional fortification system, Festung Koblenz, by Prussia between 1817 and 1828 and guarded the middle Rhine region, an area which French troops had repeatedly invaded before. The Prussian fortress was never attacked.

Since 2002, Ehrenbreitstein has formed part of the UNESCO World Heritage Site Upper Middle Rhine Valley.

== Location ==
Ehrenbreitstein is located on the eastern bank of the Rhine at Koblenz in Rhineland-Palatinate, Germany. It overlooks the confluence of the Mosel and the Rhine. The peak of the hill, which shares the name, is 118 metres above the Rhine. It is the northernmost point of the UNESCO World Heritage Site Upper Middle Rhine Valley.

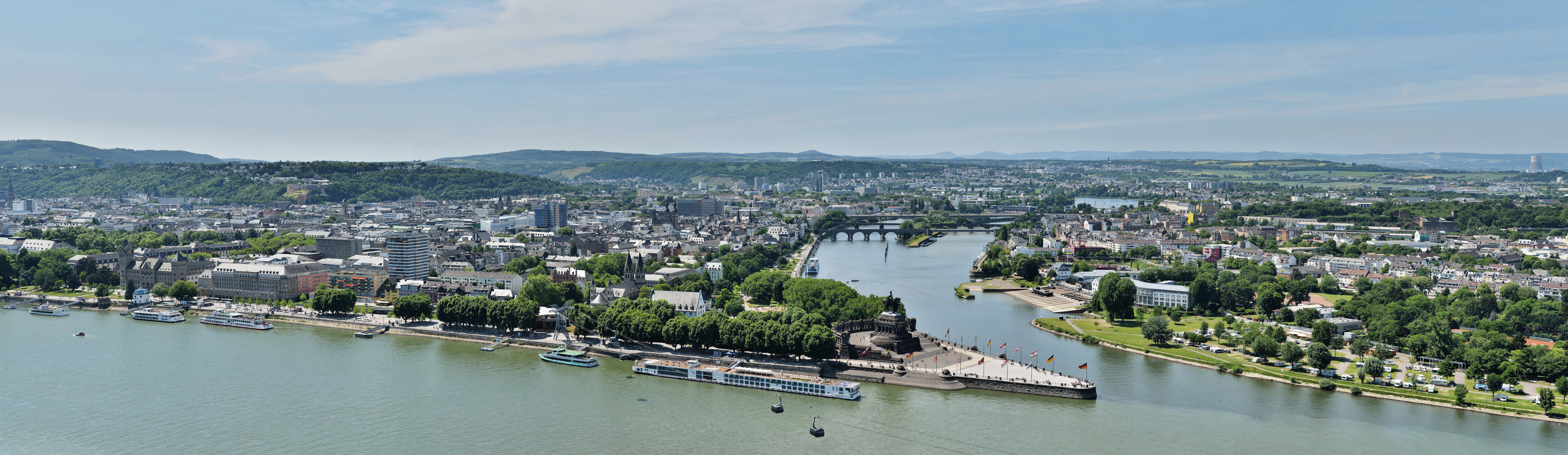
View of Koblenz from Festung Ehrenbreitstein

== History ==
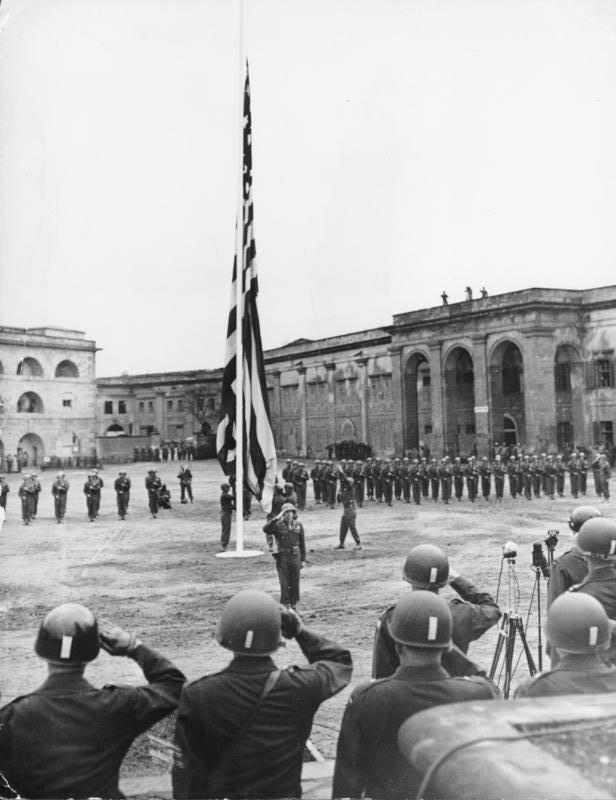
American flag from the previous occupation being raised once more at Koblenz in 1945

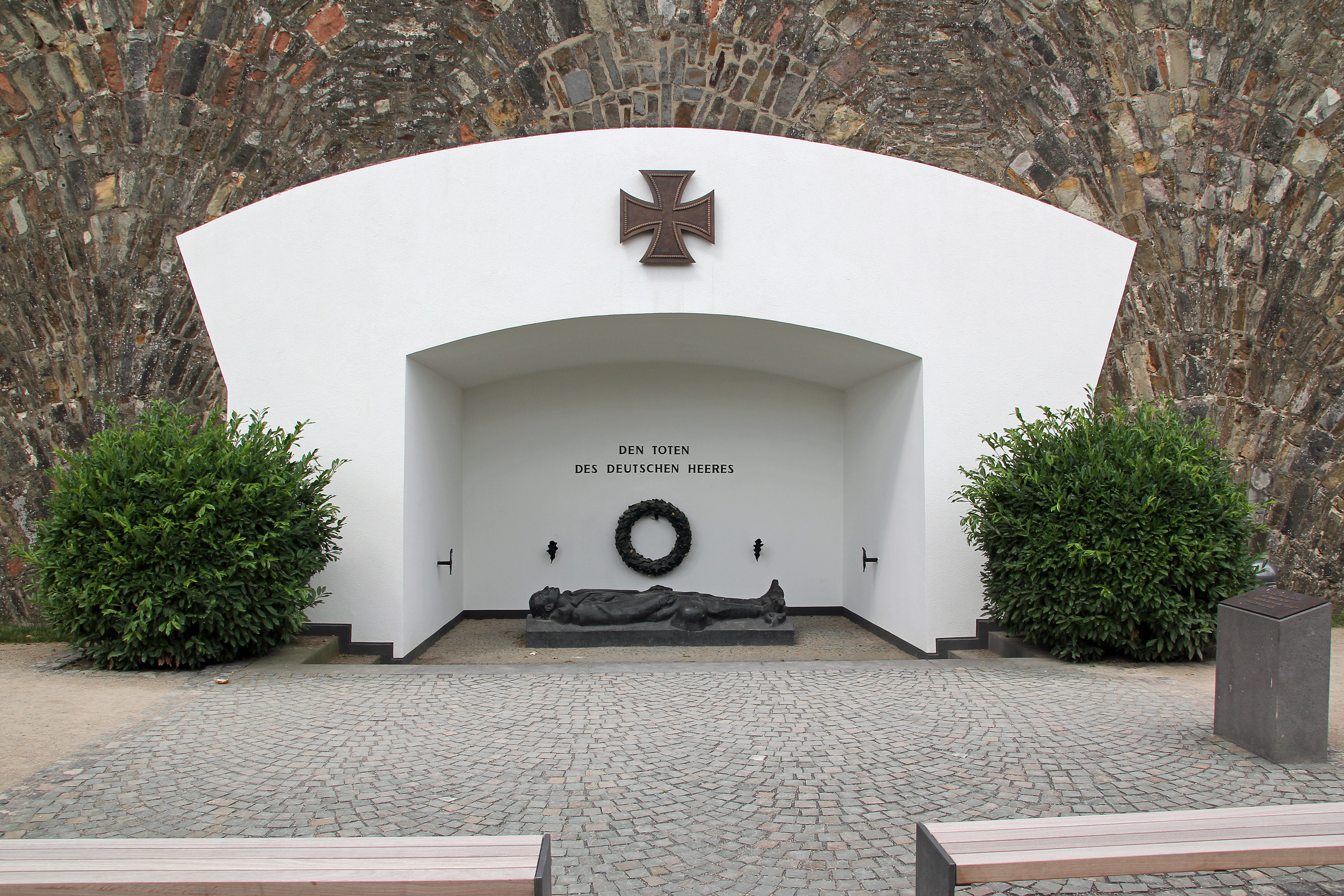
German Army Memorial (Ehrenmal des Deutschen Heeres) in the Fortress

=== Previous structures ===
Ehrenbreitstein, the hill on which the eponymous fortress is now located, was first settled in the 4th millennium BC, and fortifications were built in the 10th/9th century BC. In the 3rd to 5th centuries AD a Roman fortification was sited there. More settlement followed in the 8th/9th centuries under the Carolingian dynasty.

In about 1000 a noble called Ehrenbert (or Erembert) erected a castle on the hill. Its initial name "Burg Ehrenbertstein" later became Burg Ehrenbreitstein.

The castle was first mentioned in an extant written document in 1139, as a property of the Archbishop of Trier. Archbishop Hillin expanded it in 1152–1169. A supporting castle (Burg Helferstein) was built on the hill known as Helfenstein to the south. It was further extended by Archbishop Henry of Fénétrange in 1286, and Archbishop John II of Baden in 1481.

During the 16th century, work began to turn the castle into a fortress that could withstand the new gunpowder weapons. One of the first cannon was the 9 ton Greif cannon of 1524. At the foot of the hill, protected by the fortress, Philipp Christoph von Sötern had the palace Phillipsburg constructed in 1625–1629. The fortress was further improved by his successors Karl Kaspar von der Leyen and Johann Hugo von Orsbeck. In 1632, it was occupied by the French and in 1637 by Imperial troops during the Thirty Years' War.

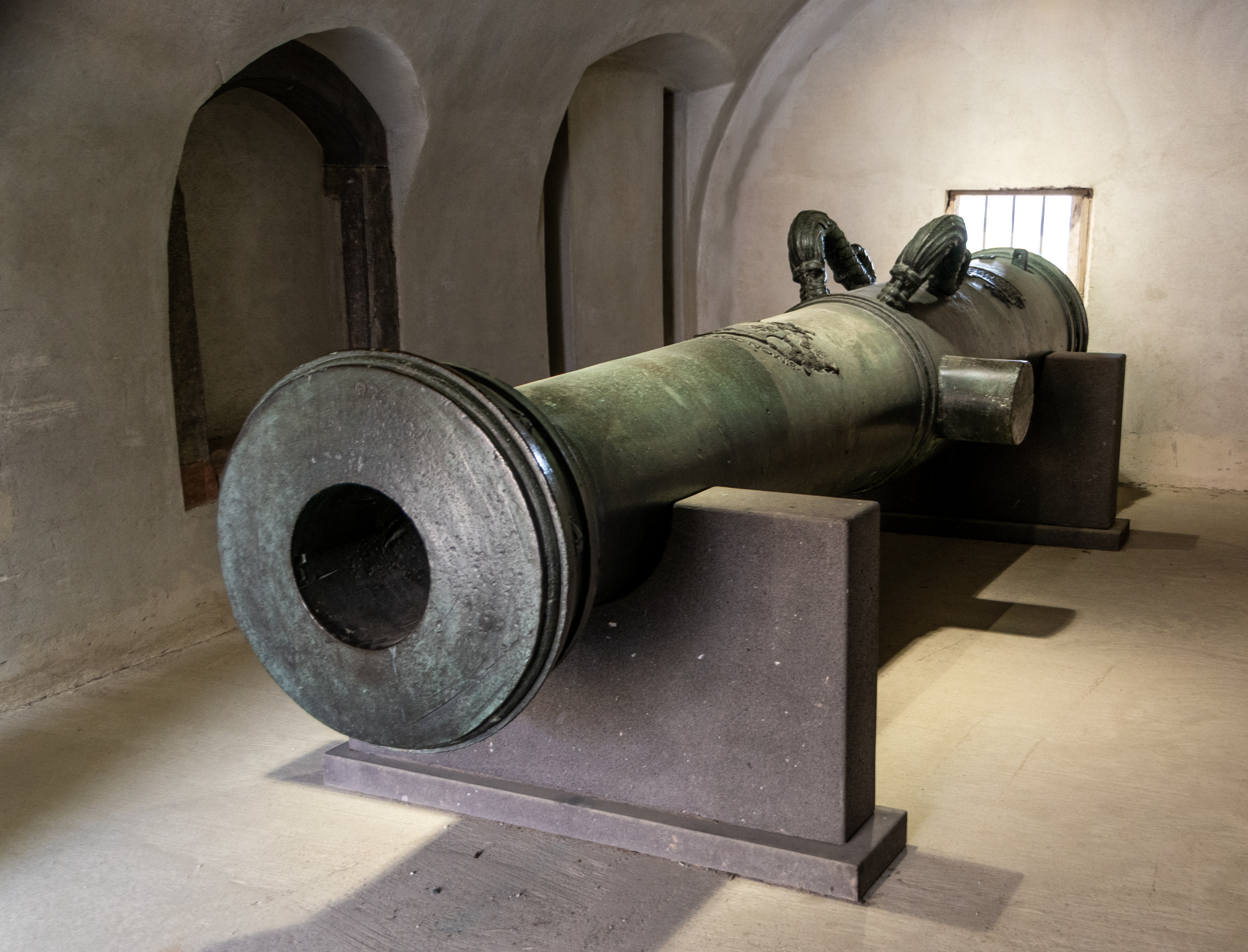
The Greif cannon, 2025

Ehrenbreitstein guarded the most valuable relic of the Trier See, the Holy Tunic, from 1657 to 1794. Successive Archbishops used the fortress' strategic importance to barter between contending powers; thus in 1672 at the outset of war between France and Germany the Archbishop refused requests both from the envoys of Louis XIV and from Brandenburg's Ambassador, Christoph Caspar von Blumenthal, to permit the passage of troops across the Rhine.

In 1688, the fortress successfully withstood a siege by King Louis XIV of France. Around 1730, Balthasar Neumann created the Schönborn-Werke, a third ring of fortifications. France did succeed in taking it in 1759, but only held it for three years.

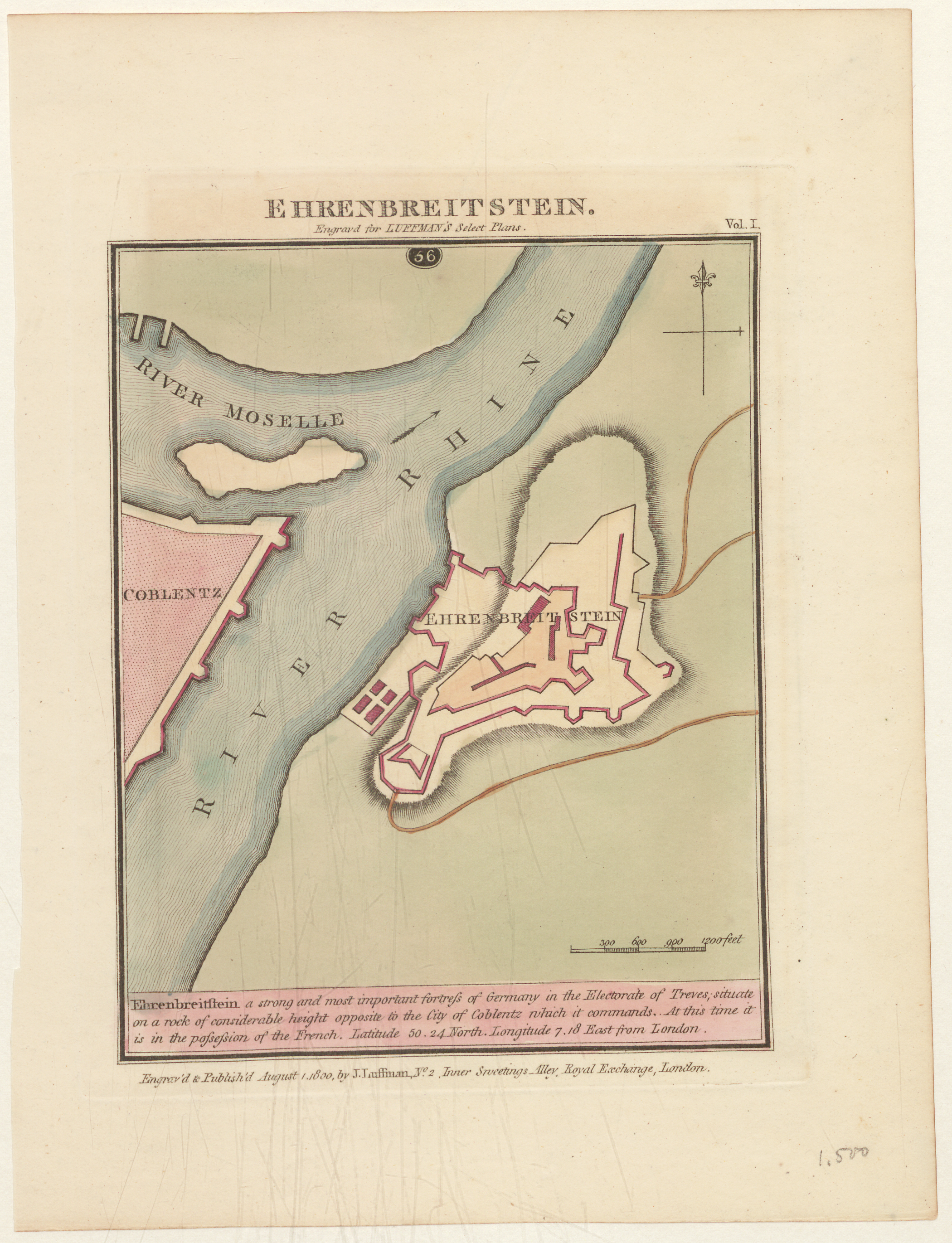
Fortress Ehrenbreitstein 1800

However, in 1794, French revolutionary troops conquered Koblenz; in the following years they besieged Ehrenbreitstein three times without success. A one-year siege, starting in 1798 during the War of the Second Coalition, brought starvation to the defenders of Ehrenbreitstein who finally handed over the fortress to French troops in 1799. By the Treaty of Lunéville, the French were eventually forced to withdraw from the right bank of the Rhine. Hence, they blew up Ehrenbreitstein in 1801 to prevent the enemy from taking hold of a fully functional fortress just a few meters away from French territory on the left bank of the Rhine.

From 1803 to 1815 the area was part of Nassau.

=== Today's fortress ===
Under the Final Act of the Congress of Vienna in 1815, the Rhineland became a Prussian province. The fortification of the Koblenz area became a Prussian military priority, because of its proximity to France and the fact that Koblenz was a bottleneck for all means of transportation (ships, railways, land transportation because of bridges). Hence, the Prussians built a system of fortification around Koblenz, the so-called Festung Koblenz ("Fortress Koblenz"), from 1815 until 1834. This referred to the strong ring of fortifications around Koblenz, of which the Festung Ehrenbreitstein was a part. Fortress Koblenz was said to have been the largest military fortress in Europe except for Gibraltar. Ehrenbreitstein could be defended by up to 1200 soldiers.

Under a peace treaty France paid 15 million francs towards a new fortress. Actual construction took from 1817 to 1828, and it was ready for service by 1834. Subsequently expanded several times, by 1886 Koblenz was classified as a fortification "of lesser importance". After the Koblenz fortifications west of the Rhine were dismantled in 1890–1903, the fortress and some lesser structures on the east bank alone covered the Rhine crossing until 1918.

During its years of active service, the fortress was never attacked. It escaped being dismantled after the end of World War I as a result of its perceived historical and artistic value. The American General Henry Tureman Allen, convinced of its historical value as a premier 19th-century fortress, prevented its intended destruction in 1922. It was occupied after 1919 by the US Army as their headquarters during the Occupation of the Rhineland. In February 1923, Allen left the fortress, and the first U.S. occupation of European territory was over. After January 1923, Ehrenbreitstein was occupied by the French Army.

During World War II, the fortress served as a place of safekeeping for archives and cultural objects (1943–56) but also harbored three flak guns (1943–1945).

After World War II, the fortress was used by the French Army, before it was handed over to the State of Rhineland-Palatinate in 1947. In 1946–1950 it served as a refugee camp and then as residential housing, during the period of housing shortages from the early 1950s into the 1960s. In 1952, a youth hostel was opened, followed by a museum in 1956. In 1972, the Ehrenmal des Deutschen Heeres (a memorial to the dead of the German army) was inaugurated. In 2011, Festung Ehrenbreitstein was part of the Bundesgartenschau (National Garden Show) in Koblenz, following a multi-year restoration in 2007–2011.

== Today ==
The fortress is open to visitors. It is connected to the town of Koblenz across the Rhine by a cable car and by an inclined lift to the foot of the hill. Ehrenbreitstein houses several museums: Haus der Fotografie (photography), Haus der Archäologie (archaeology) and the Landesmuseum Koblenz (temporary exhibitions). There is also a Haus des Genusses, celebrating regional wine making and offering a Baroque dining experience. Permanent exhibitions at several locations inside the fortress cover the 5000 years of history of Ehrenbreitstein. There are also gastronomic establishments. The Koblenz youth hostel, with 157 beds, still occupies part of Ehrenbreitstein. The fortress serves as a venue for various cultural activities, such as open-air concerts and plays.

== Cultural references ==
In 1822, the English translation of the castle's name, The Broad-Stone of Honour, was used as the title of Kenelm Henry Digby's exhaustive work on chivalry.

...this pulpit, I see, is a self-containing stronghold —a lofty Ehrenbreitstein... (Herman Melville, Moby-Dick)

As the vine flourishes, and the grape empurples close up to the very walls and muzzles of cannoned Ehrenbreitstein; so do the sweetest joys of life grow in the very jaws of its perils. (Herman Melville, Pierre)

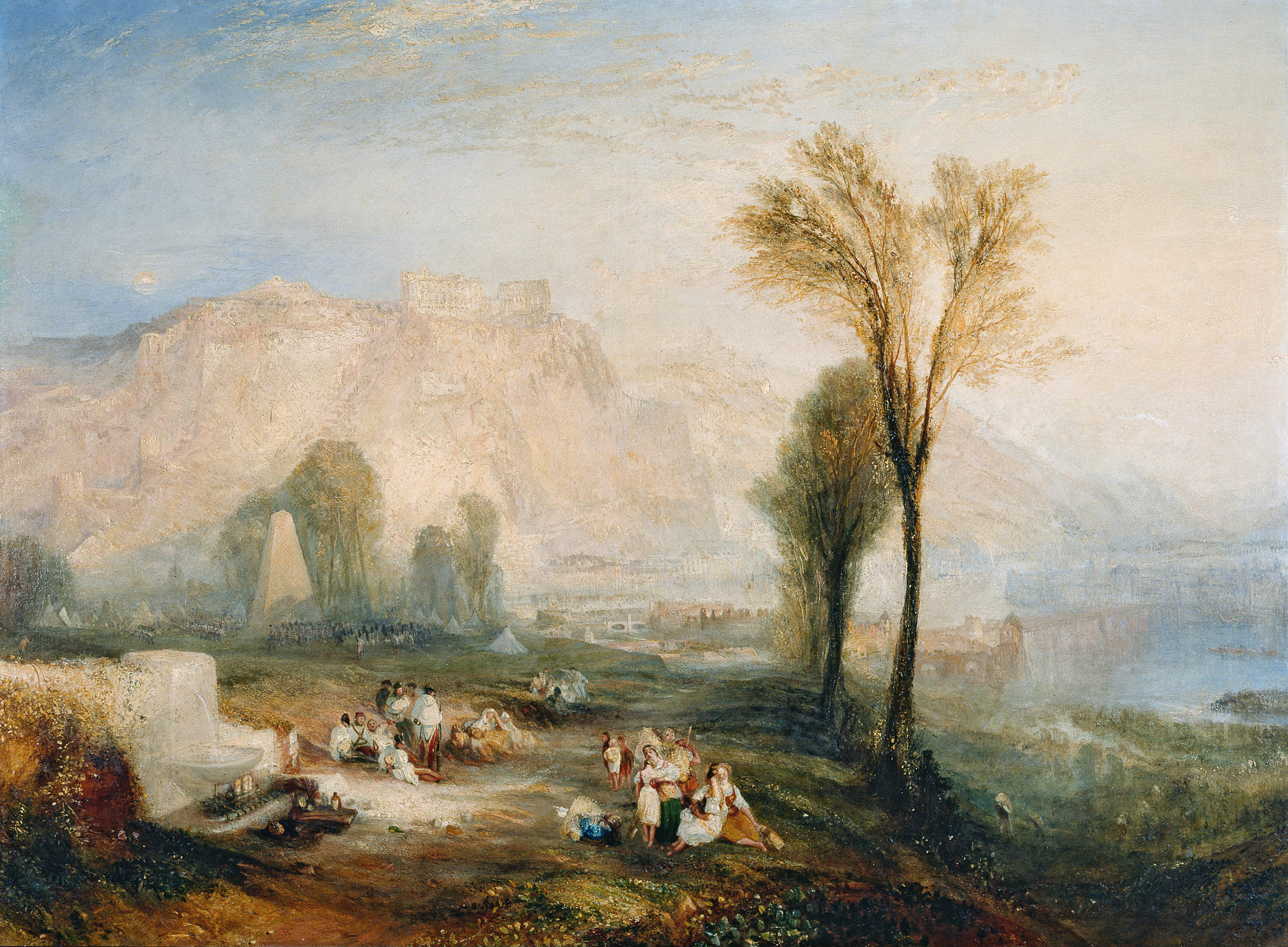
J. M. W. Turner, View of Ehrenbreitstein (1835)

Here Ehrenbreitstein, with her shattered wall
Black with the miner's blast, upon her height
Yet shows of what she was, when shell and ball
Rebounding idly on her strength did light;
A tower of victory! from whence the flight
Of baffled foes was watch'd along the plain:
But Peace destroy'd what War could never blight,
And laid those proud roofs bare to Summer's rain—
On which the iron shower for years had pour'd in vain.
(Lord Byron, Childe Harold's Pilgrimage Canto III, v.58)

Byron in fact refers to the previous structure, destroyed by the French, since the new fortification was only constructed after he wrote these lines.

In 1835, J. M. W. Turner completed a major painting inspired by Byron's work, entitled View of Ehrenbreitstein, or The Bright Stone of Honour and the Tomb of Marceau, from Byron's 'Childe Harold'. In April 2017, the painting was in a private collection and had an estimated value of £15m-£25m. Turner also painted a series of watercolors depicting views of the fortress and environs, some of which are held by the Tate Gallery in London.

In 1897, a monument to Emperor Wilhelm I was erected right below the Festung, but on the west side of the Rhine, known as the Deutsches Eck (German Corner). Both fortress and monument were considered as symbols for the "Guard at the Rhine", as in the song "Die Wacht am Rhein". Today the Ehrenbreitstein Fortress is used for concerts and as a museum.

== World Heritage Site ==
In 2002, the Upper Middle Rhine Valley became a UNESCO World Heritage Site. The Site includes as its northernmost point the fortress of Ehrenbreitstein.

== See also ==
- List of forts
- Prussian semaphore system

== Bibliography ==
- von Berg, Axel (2005). Archäologische Untersuchungen im Bereich der "Großen Traverse" auf der Festung Ehrenbreitstein, Koblenz (German); in: Archäologie in Rheinland-Pfalz 2004. Verlag Phillip von Zabern. ISBN 978-3805335515.
- Böckling, Manfred (2009). Als Wallhausen Preußens Armee mobilmachte (German); in: Jahrbuch für westdeutsche Landesgeschichte 35. Landesarchivverwaltung Koblenz. pp. 521–558.
- Böckling, Manfred (2004). Festung Ehrenbreitstein (German). Schnell + Steiner, Regensburg. ISBN 978-3795414436.
- Burgen, Schlösser, Altertümer Rheinland-Pfalz(ed.) (2005). Neue Forschungen zur Festung Koblenz und Ehrenbreitstein, Band 1 (German). Schnell + Steiner. ISBN 978-3795417642.
- Burgen, Schlösser, Altertümer Rheinland-Pfalz(ed.) (2006). Neue Forschungen zur Festung Koblenz und Ehrenbreitstein, Band 2 (German). Schnell + Steiner. ISBN 978-3795419103.
- Deutsche Gesellschaft für Festungsforschung e. V.(ed.) (2012). Neue Forschungen zur Festung Koblenz und Ehrenbreitstein, Band 3 (German). Schnell + Steiner. ISBN 978-3795424756.
- Pawley, Margaret (2008). The Watch on the Rhine: The Military Occupation of the Rhineland, 1918-1930. I.B.Tauris. ISBN 978-1-84511-457-2.
- Weiß, Petra (2000). Die Bergung von Kulturgütern auf der Festung Ehrenbreitstein (German); in: Jahrbuch für westdeutsche Landesgeschichte 26. pp. 421–452.
- Wischemann, Rüdiger (1978). Die Festung Koblenz (German). ISBN 978-3795414436.
