= Ernst Ludwig von Aster =

German officer

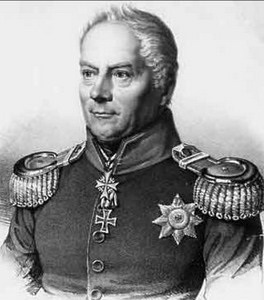
- Ernst Ludwig von Aster
- Born: October 5, 1778; Dresden
- Died: February 10, 1855 (aged 76); Berlin
- Military career
- Allegiance: (Kingdom of Prussia) Prussia
- Branch: Prussian Army

Ernst Ludwig von Aster (October 5, 1778 - February 10, 1855) was a German officer and a highly decorated Prussian, Saxon and Russian general of the German Campaign of 1813 and the War of the Seventh Coalition.

Aster took part in fortifying several fortresses, including in Cologne, Poznań and Königsberg. In his honor, in the Poznań Fortress and Koblenz Fortress forts were given the name of Aster.
