= Greif cannon =

16th century cannon

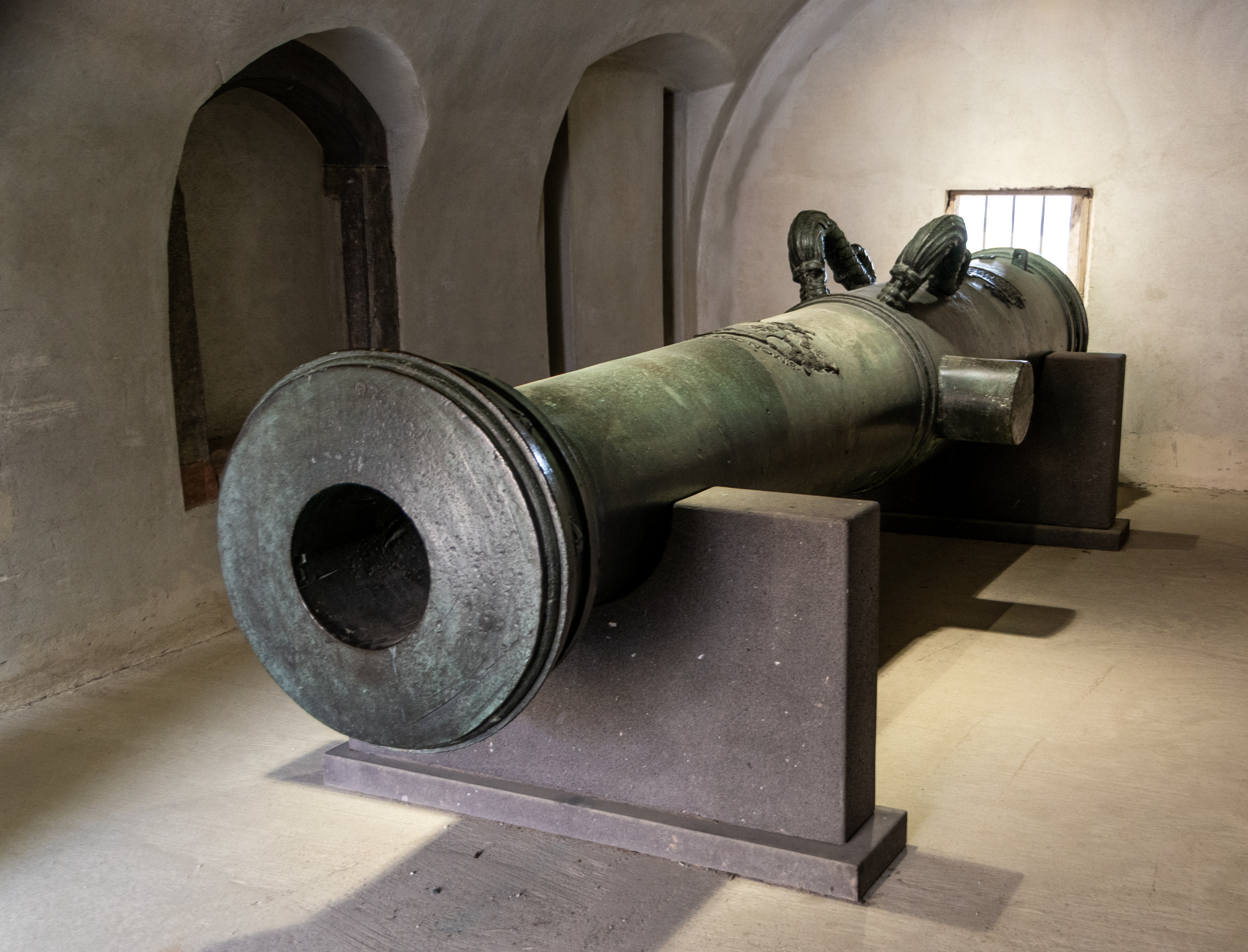
The Griffin cannon at Ehrenbreitstein Fortress

The Griffin cannon, also called Vogel Greif, (English: Bird Griffin), is one of the largest cannons from the 16th century. Since 1984, it has been in display in the Ehrenbreitstein Fortress in Koblenz. The possession of the cannon moved several times between Germany and France and became a symbol of the Franco-German reconciliation.

== History ==
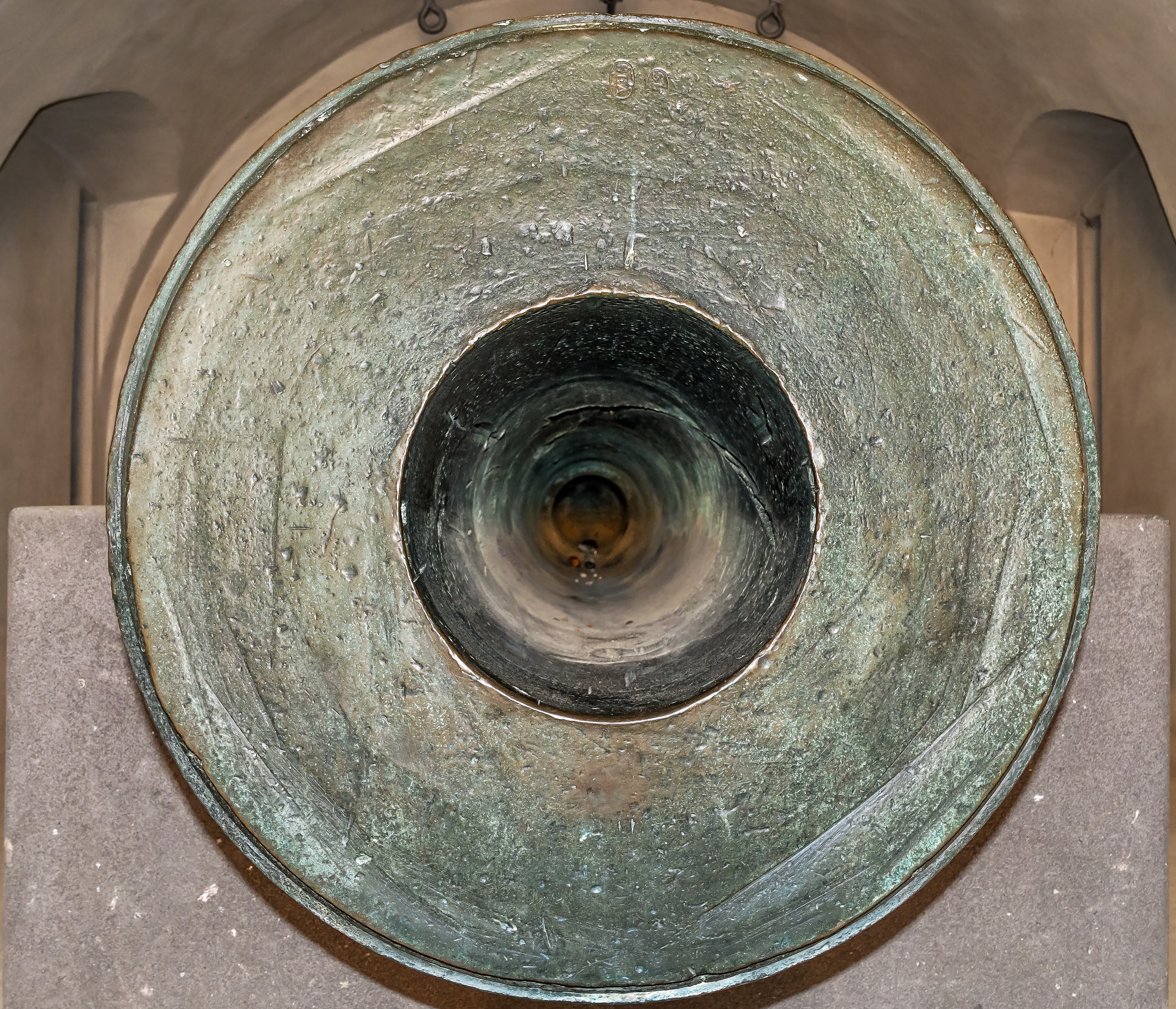
Pipe mouth of the griffin (cannon). Two stamp marks can be seen below the upper rim of the mouth

The Trier elector and archbishop Richard von Greiffenklau zu Vollrads had Master Simon from Frankfurt am Main pour the cannon in 1524 and set it up on the Ehrenbreitstein fortress. After the conquest of the Ehrenbreitstein by the French in 1799 during the coalition wars, the cannon on the Moselle was brought to the Arsenal there in Metz. Metz was besieged in 1814 and 1815. Since the French feared the fall of the city, they buried the Griffin in the ground or sank it in the Seille. In 1866 it was moved to Paris by rail to the French Musée de l'Armée in the Hôtel des Invalides, Paris.

In 1940, after the conquest of France by Nazi Germany, the cannon was sent back to Koblenz. After the war it was brought back to Paris during the French occupation of Koblenz following World War II in 1946. As part of the Franco-German reconciliation, French President François Mitterrand signed in 1984 with German Chancellor Helmut Kohl an agreement for permanently lending it to the fortress Ehrenbreitstein. The director of the French Musée de l'Armée resigned in protest. Since then, the cannon has been one of the best-known exhibits of the Koblenz State Museum.

The Griffin was allegedly never used due to a closed ignition hole but this was refuted after finding four bullets and black powder residue in the cannon. The ignition hole was closed with iron nails at some point after it was used.

== Description ==
Made of cast bronze, the Griffin weighs nine tons and is 4.66 meters long. With a 280-mm caliber, it was designed as a siege cannon and, according to theoretical calculations, was able to fire balls weighing 80 kg, using 40 kg of black powder, up to 16 km. Although the cannon had been fired, no engagement in the battle is documented.

The inscription on the cannon reads:

SIMON GOS MICH 1524
VOGEL GREIF
DER GREIF HEIS ICH MEINEM GENEDIGEN HERRN VON DRIR DIN ICH WO ER MICH HEIST GEWALDEN DO WIL ICH DORN UND MAURN ZU SPALTEN

== See also ==
- List of the largest cannon by caliber
