= Rhine Gorge =

Upper Middle Rhine Valley
UNESCO World Heritage Site
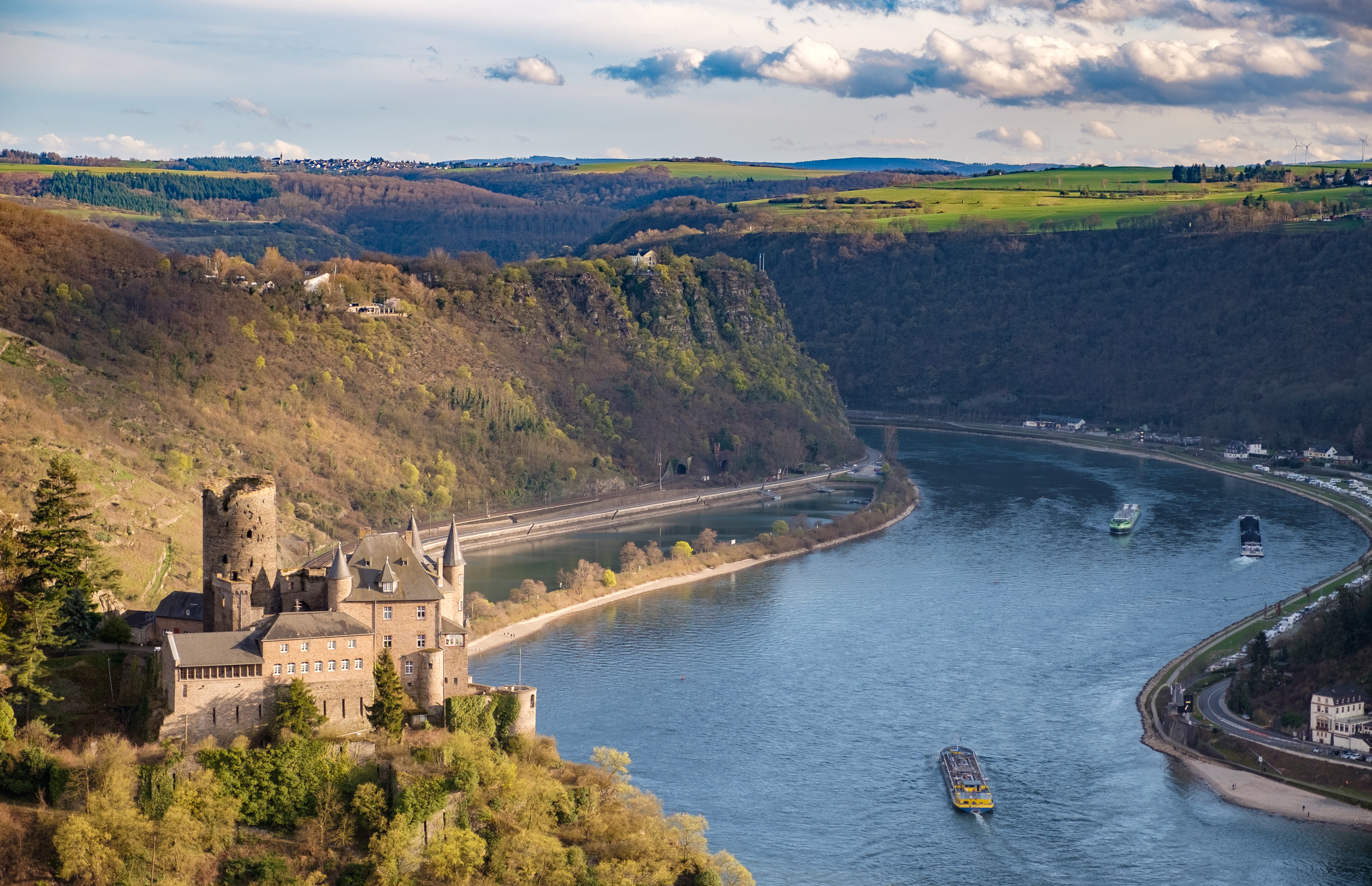
- St. Goarshausen, castle Katz with Loreley rock in the Rhineland-Palatinate

- Location within Germany
- Location: Rheinland Pfalz and Hessen in Germany
- Criteria: Cultural: (ii), (iv), (v)
- Reference: 1066
- Inscription: 2002 (26th Session)
- Area: 27,250 ha (67,300 acres)
- Buffer zone: 34,680 ha (85,700 acres)
- Coordinates: 50°10′25″N 7°41′39″E

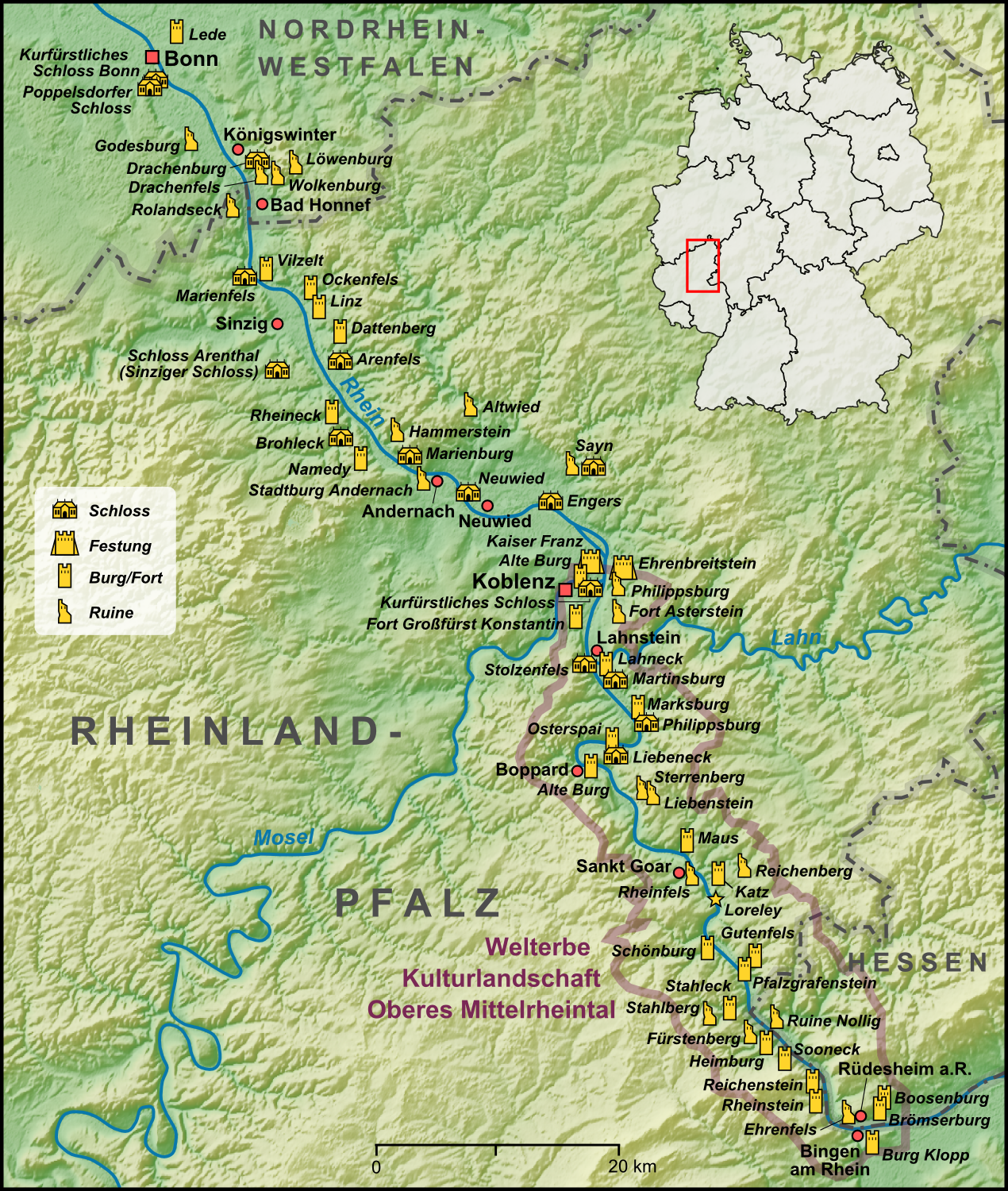
Map of the Middle Rhine Valley

Upper Middle Rhine Valley is the 65 km (40 mi) southern section of the Middle Rhine between Koblenz and Rüdesheim in the states of Rhineland-Palatinate and Hesse in Germany. It was added to the UNESCO list of World Heritage Sites in June 2002 because of its beauty as a cultural landscape, its importance as a route of transport across Europe, and the unique adaptations of the buildings and terraces to the steep slopes of the gorge.

The region's rocks were laid down in the Devonian period and are known as Rhenish Facies. This is a fossil-bearing sedimentary rock type consisting mainly of slate. The rocks underwent considerable folding during the Carboniferous period. The gorge was carved out during a much more recent uplift to leave the river contained within steep walls 200 m (660 ft) high, the most famous feature being the Loreley.

The gorge produces its own microclimate and has acted as a corridor for species not otherwise found in the region. Its slopes have long been terraced for agriculture, in particular viticulture which has good conditions on south-facing slopes. Most of the vineyards belong to the wine region Mittelrhein, but the southernmost parts of the Rhine Gorge fall in Rheingau and Nahe.

The river has been an important trade route into central Europe since prehistoric times and a string of small settlements has grown up along the banks. Constrained in size, many of these old towns retain a historic feel today. With increasing wealth, roughly 40 hilltop castles were built and the valley became a core region of the Holy Roman Empire. It was at the centre of the Thirty Years' War, which left many of the castles in ruins, a particular attraction for today's cruise ships which follow the river. At one time forming a border of France, in the 19th century the valley became part of Prussia and its landscape became the quintessential image of Germany.

This part of the Rhine features strongly in folklore, such as a legendary castle on the Rhine being the setting for the opera Götterdämmerung. The annual Rhine in Flames festivals include spectacular firework displays at Sankt Goar in September and Koblenz in August, the best view being from one of a convoy of boats.

== Towns and cities along the gorge ==
- Koblenz (west+east)
- Lahnstein (east)
- Rhens (west)
- Braubach (east)
- Boppard (west)
- St. Goarshausen (east) and almost directly opposite
- Sankt Goar (west) by the Loreley rock (east)
- Oberwesel (west)
- Kaub (east)
- Bacharach (west)
- Lorch (east)
- Assmannshausen (east)
- Bingen (west)
- Rüdesheim (east)

== Gallery ==
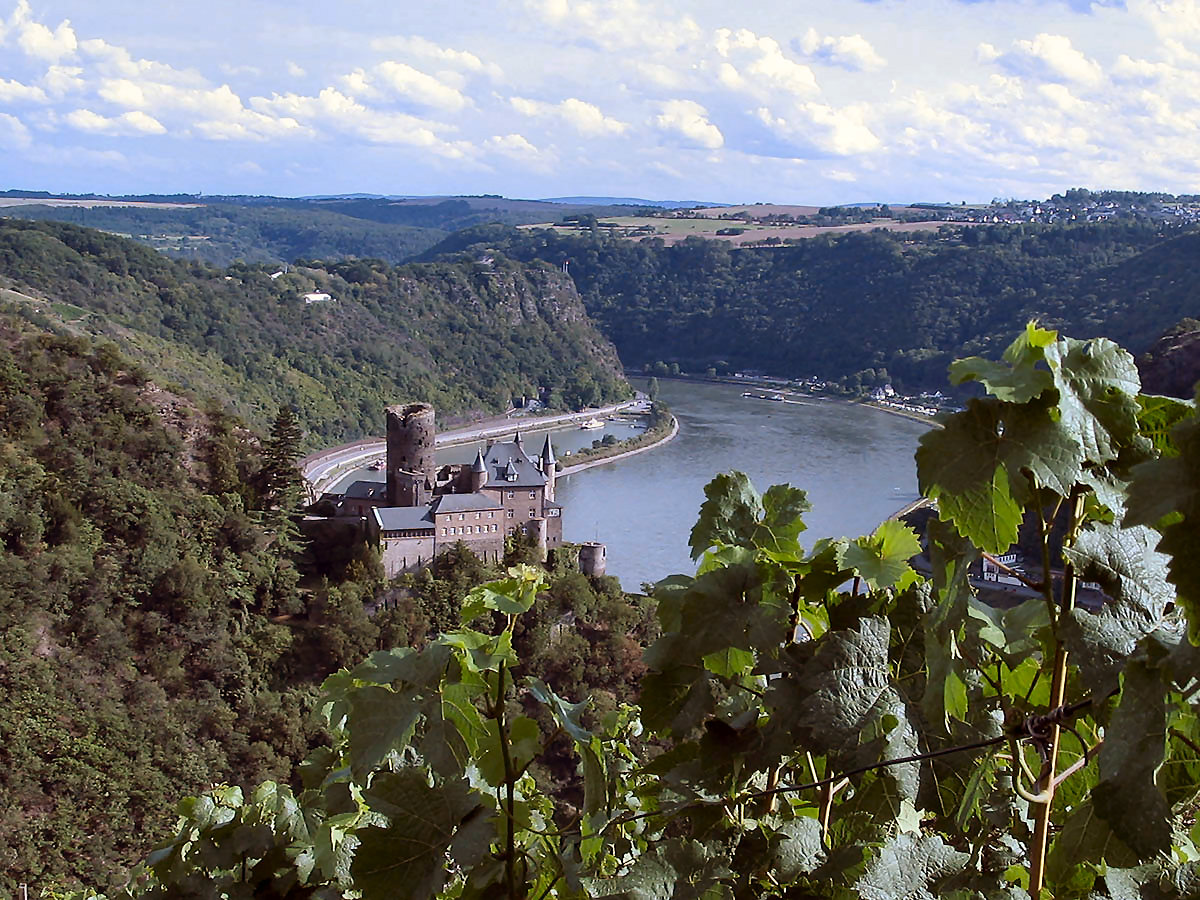
View of Burg Katz, with the Lorelei in the background

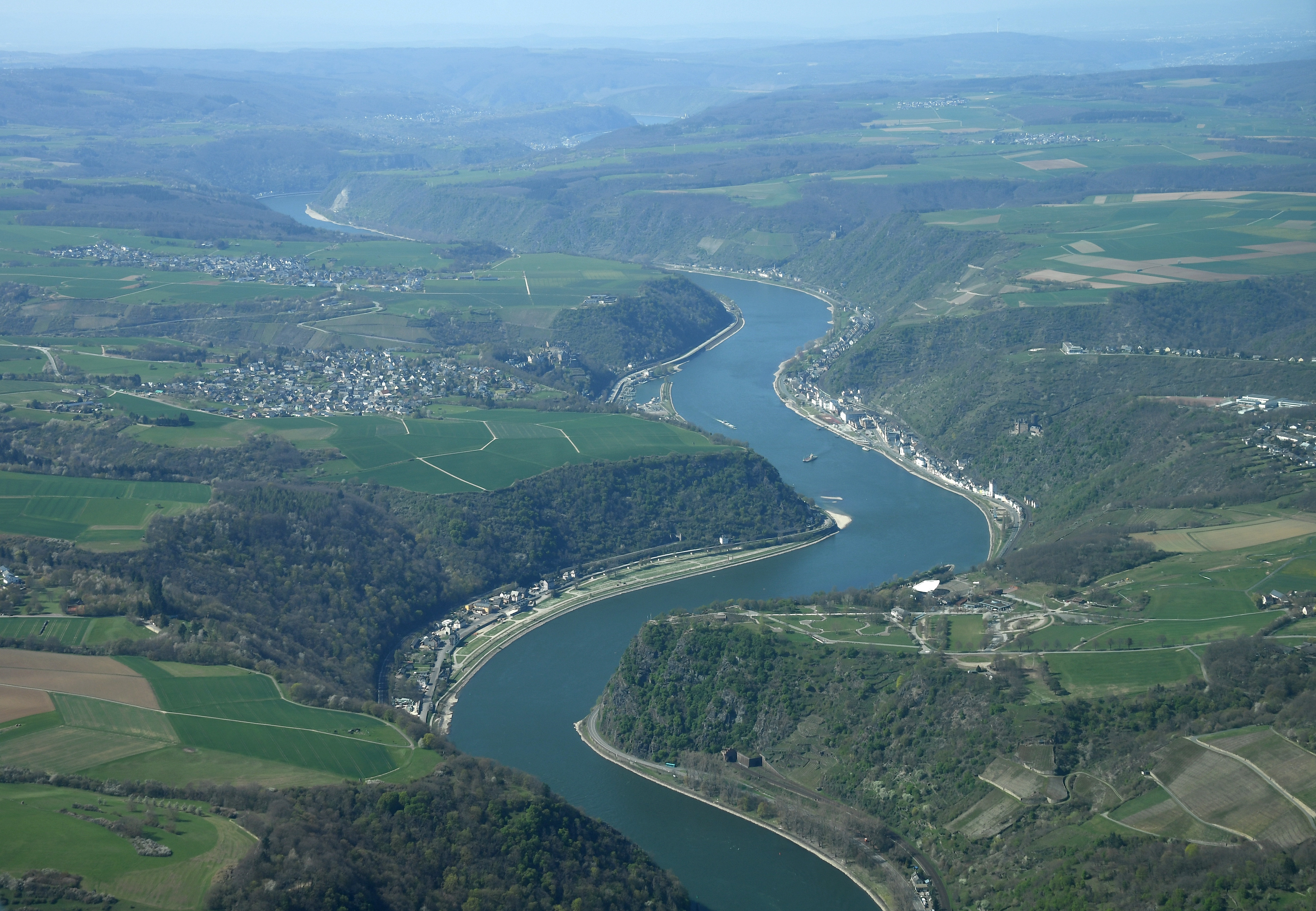
Aerial image of the Upper Middle Rhine Valley in the area of Sankt Goarshausen with the Lorelei at the bottom of the image

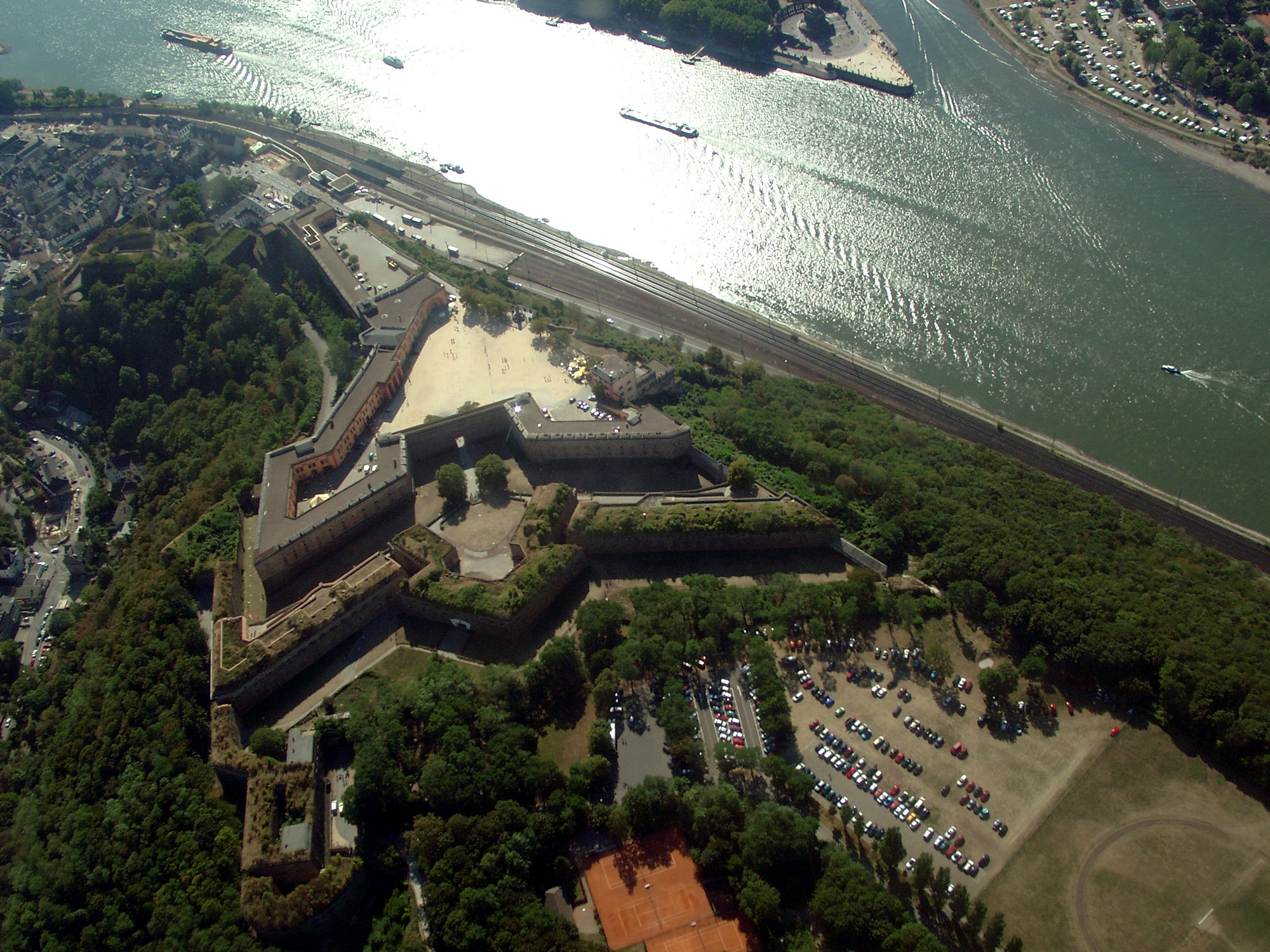
Koblenz, the northern gateway to the World Heritage Site, with the Ehrenbreitstein Fortress

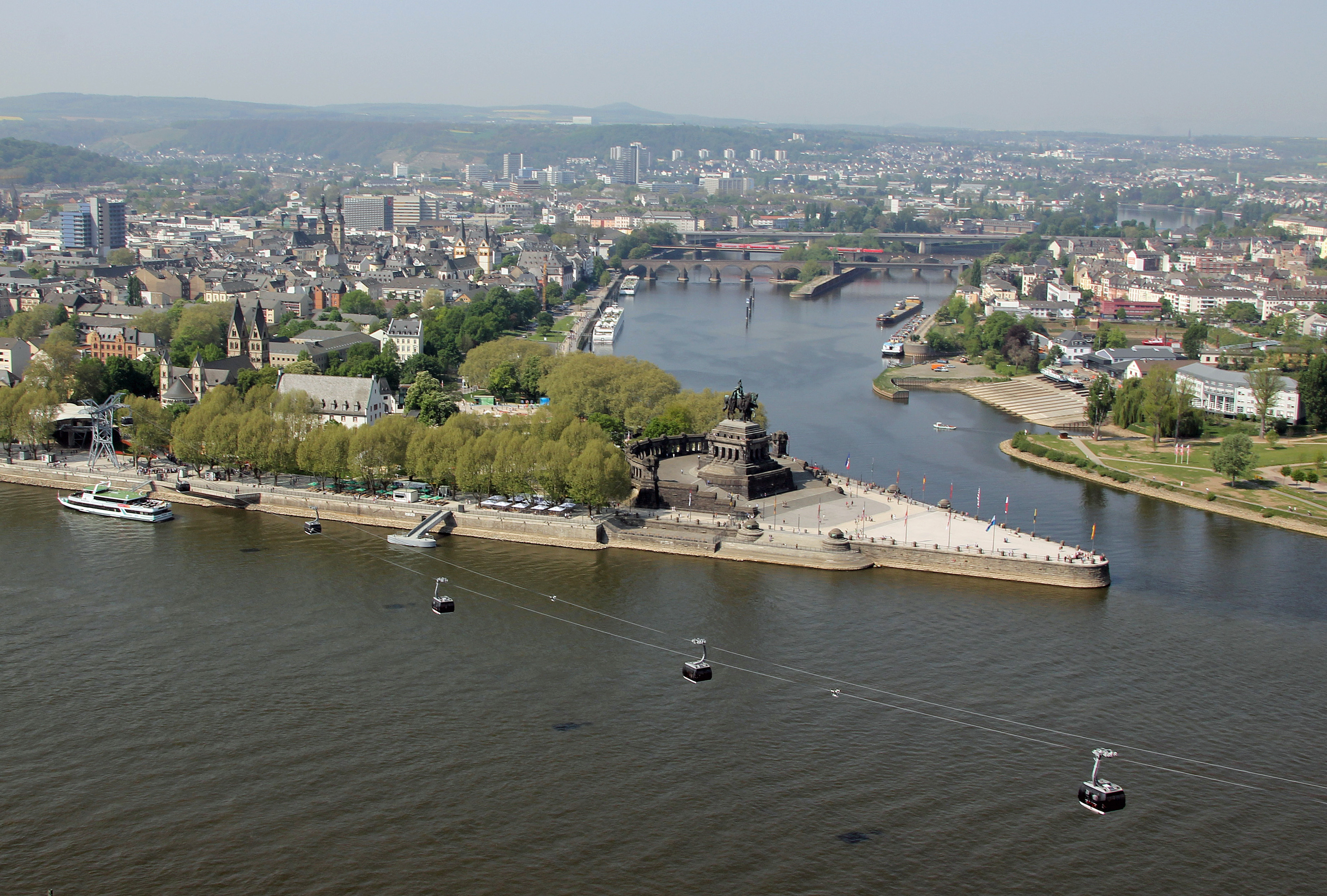
Deutsches Eck, at the confluence of Rhine and Moselle

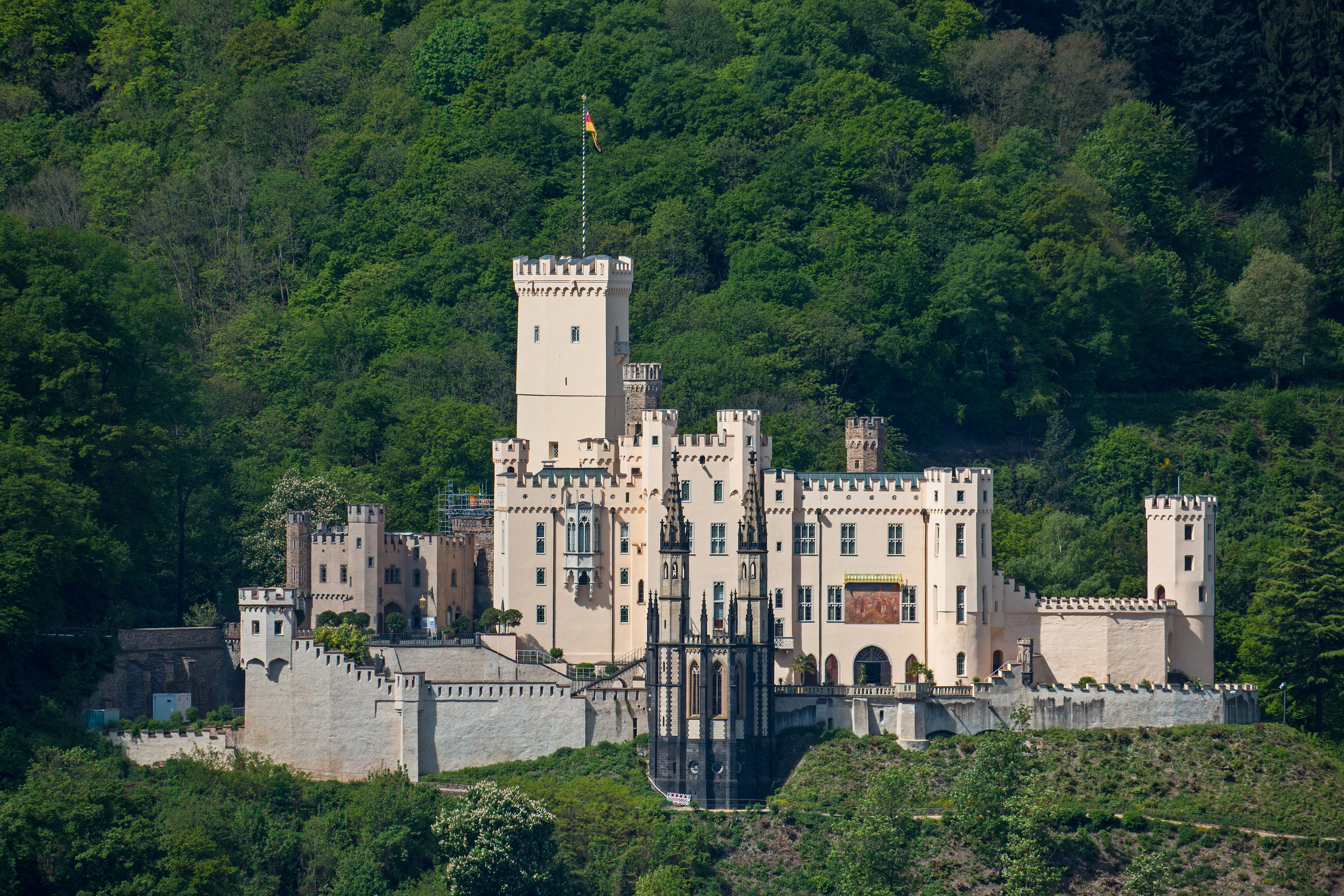
Stolzenfels Castle, near Koblenz, the epitome of the Rhine romanticism

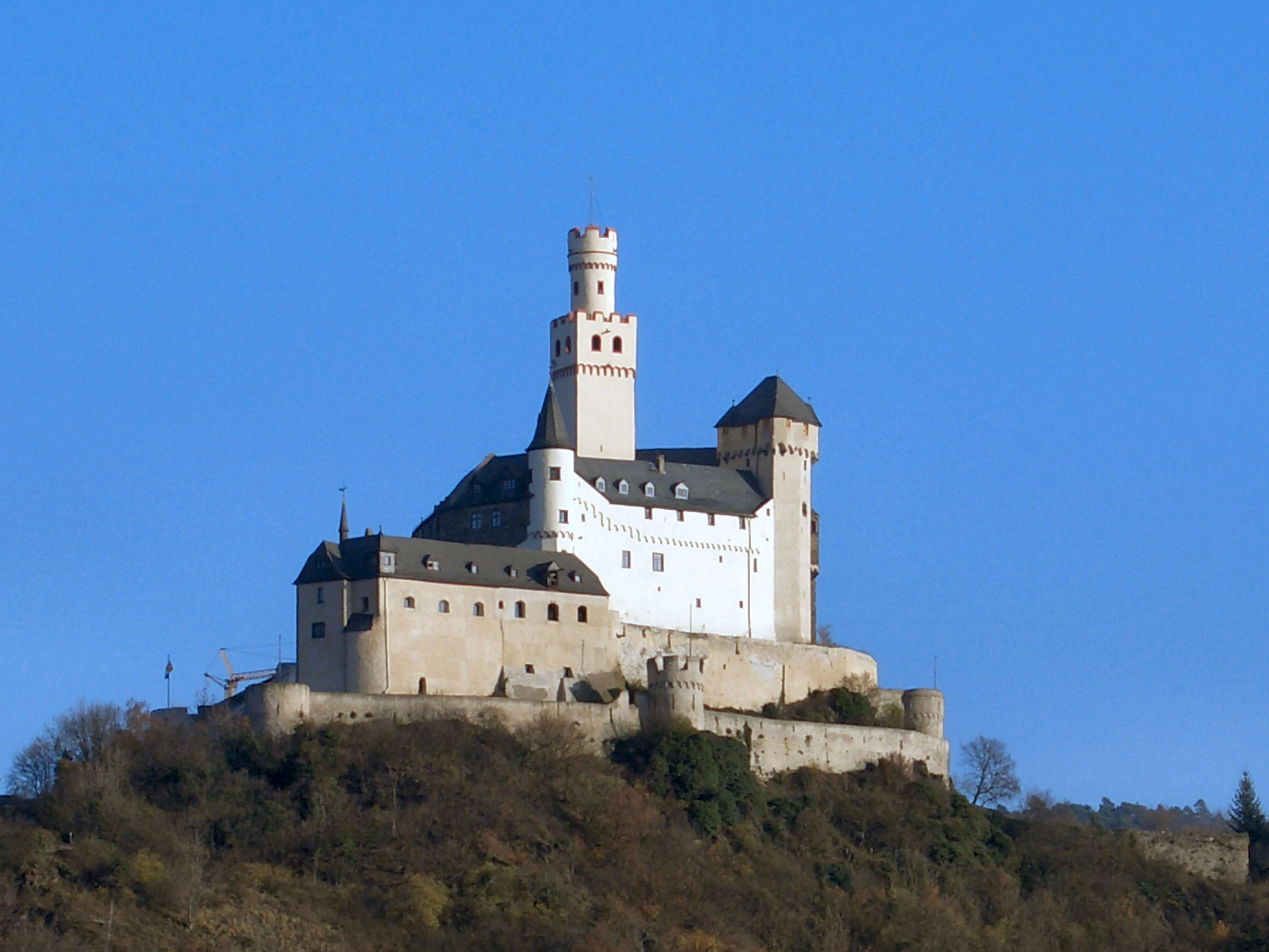
Marksburg Castle, the only hilltop castle in the Middle Rhine Valley that was never destroyed

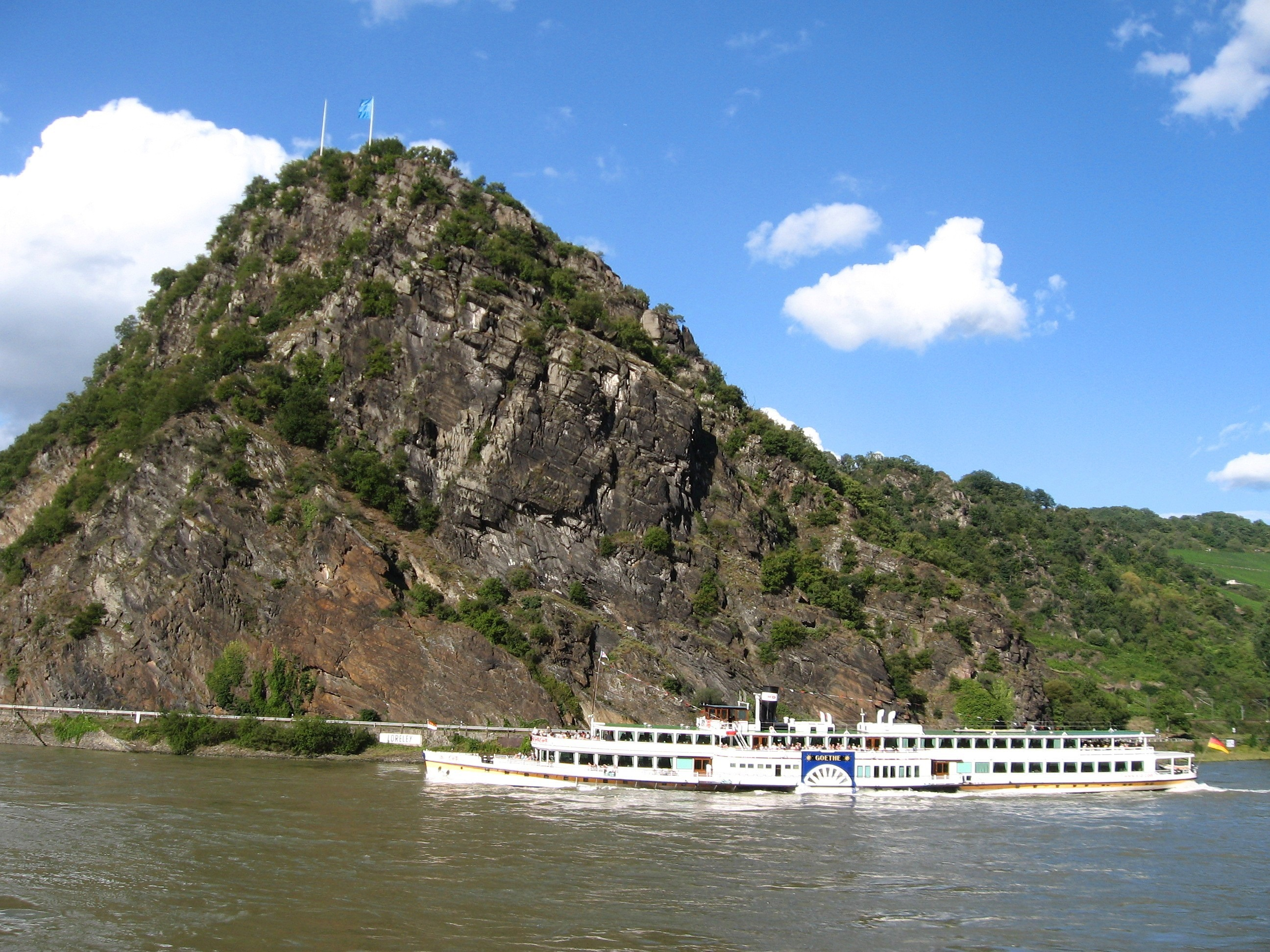
View from the left bank of the Rhine near St. Goar on the Lorelei

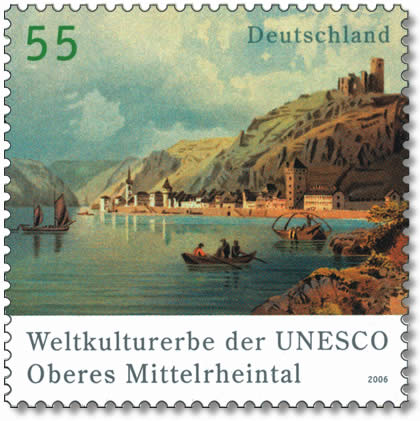
Stamp from 2006, showing the World Heritage Site

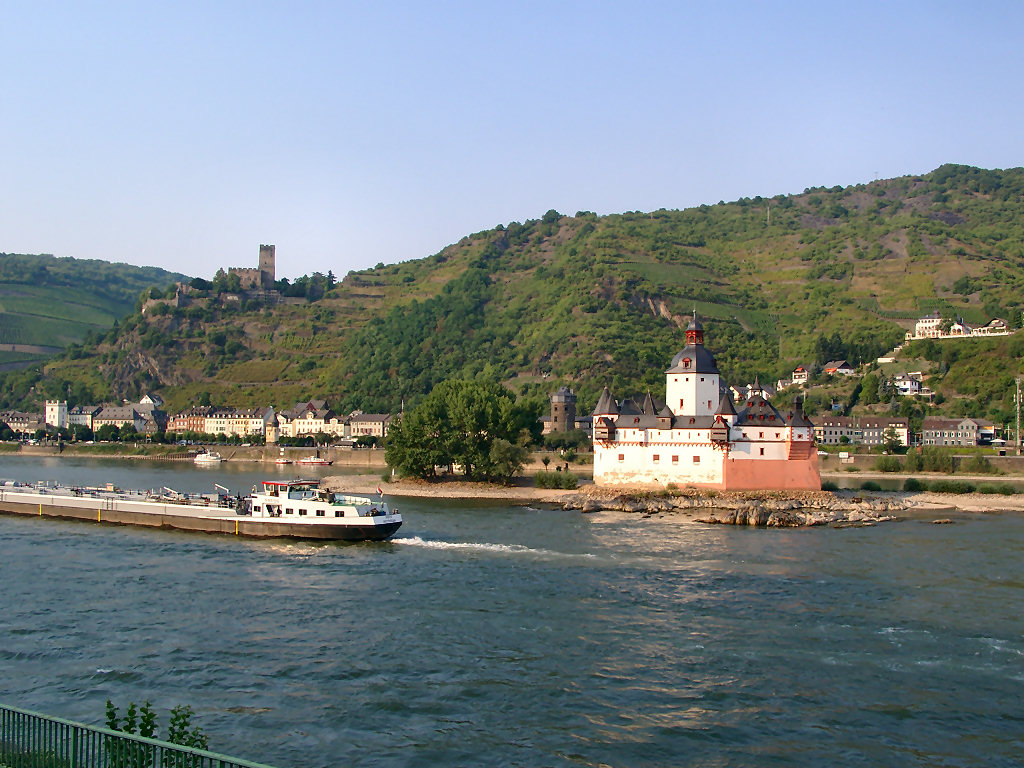
Burg Pfalzgrafenstein in the middle of the river, at Kaub, in the background Burg Gutenfels

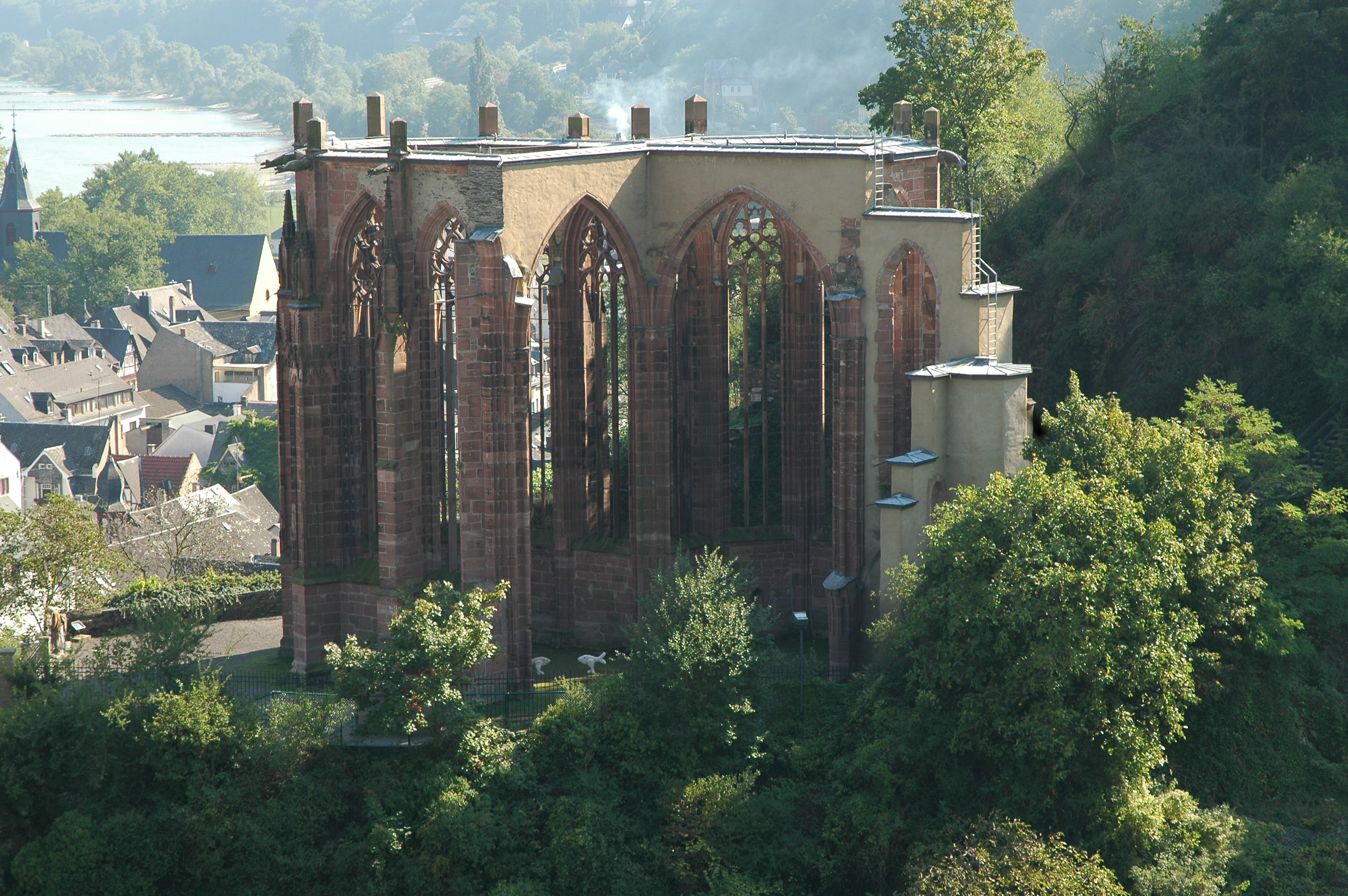
Werner Chapel at Bacharach

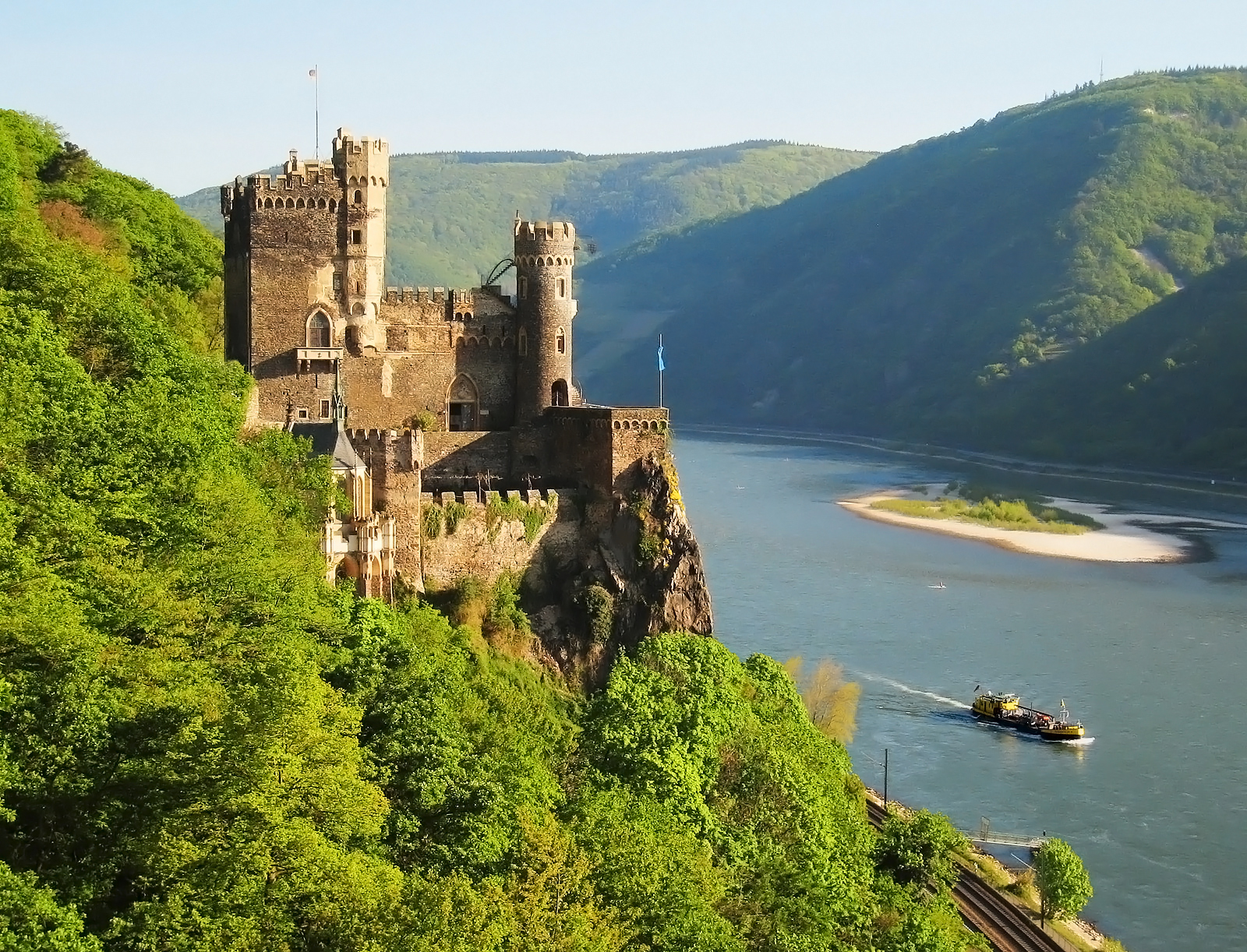
Burg Rheinstein, the first castle to be rebuilt in the 19th century

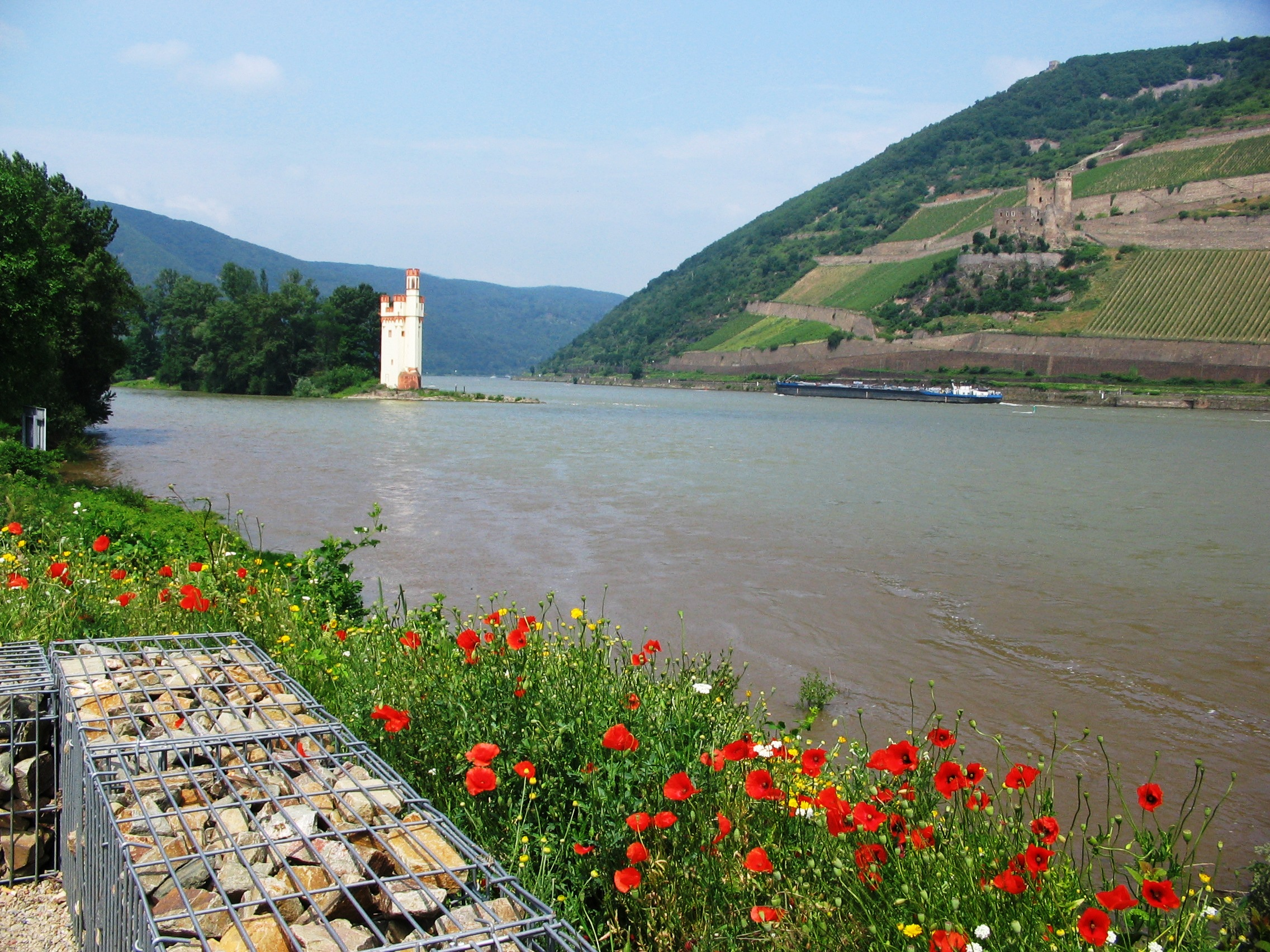
Binger Loch, the southern gateway to the gorge; on the left the Mouse Tower, on the right Burg Ehrenfels Castle

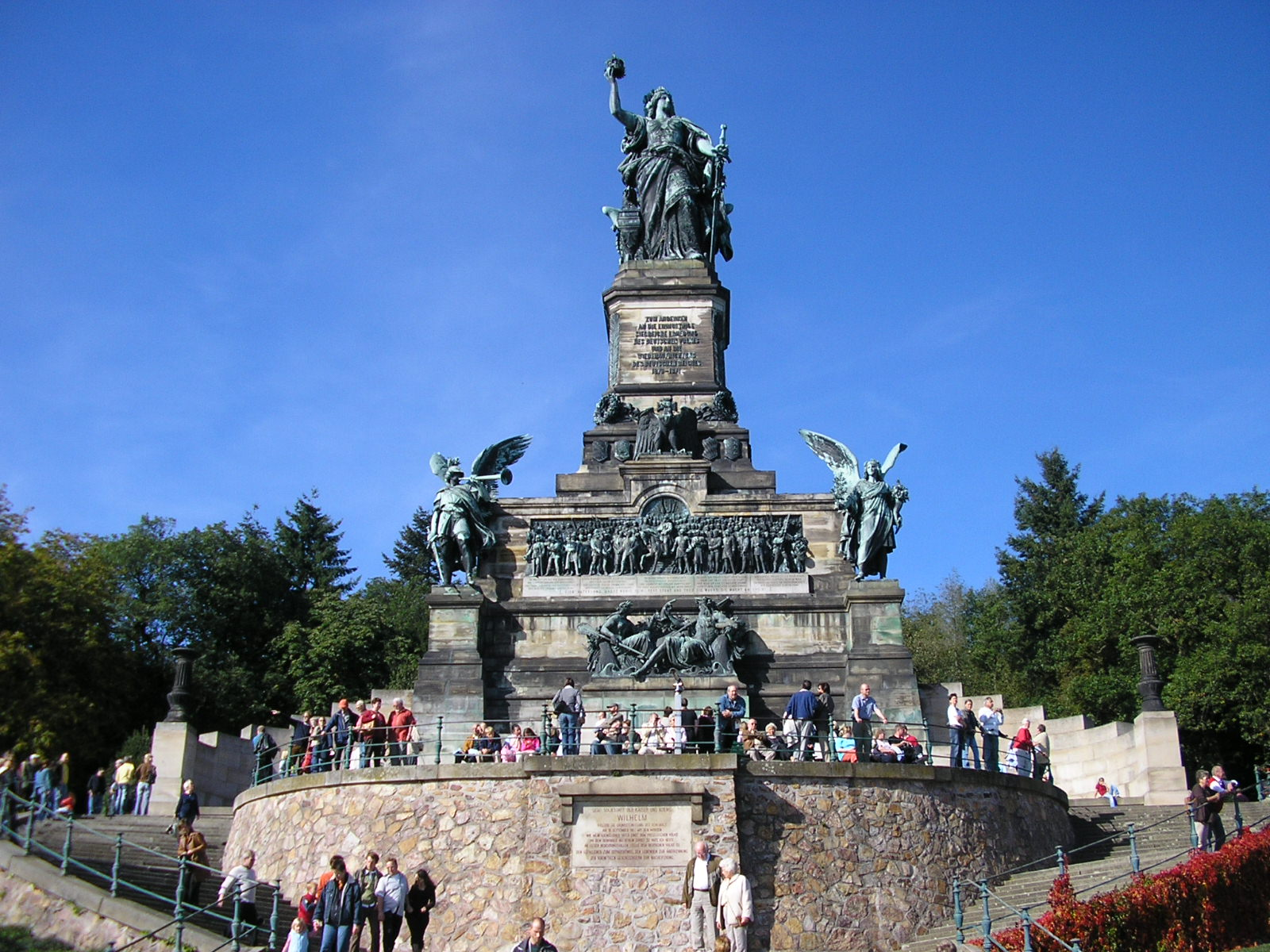
The Niederwalddenkmal monument, with Germania (personification), at Rüdesheim

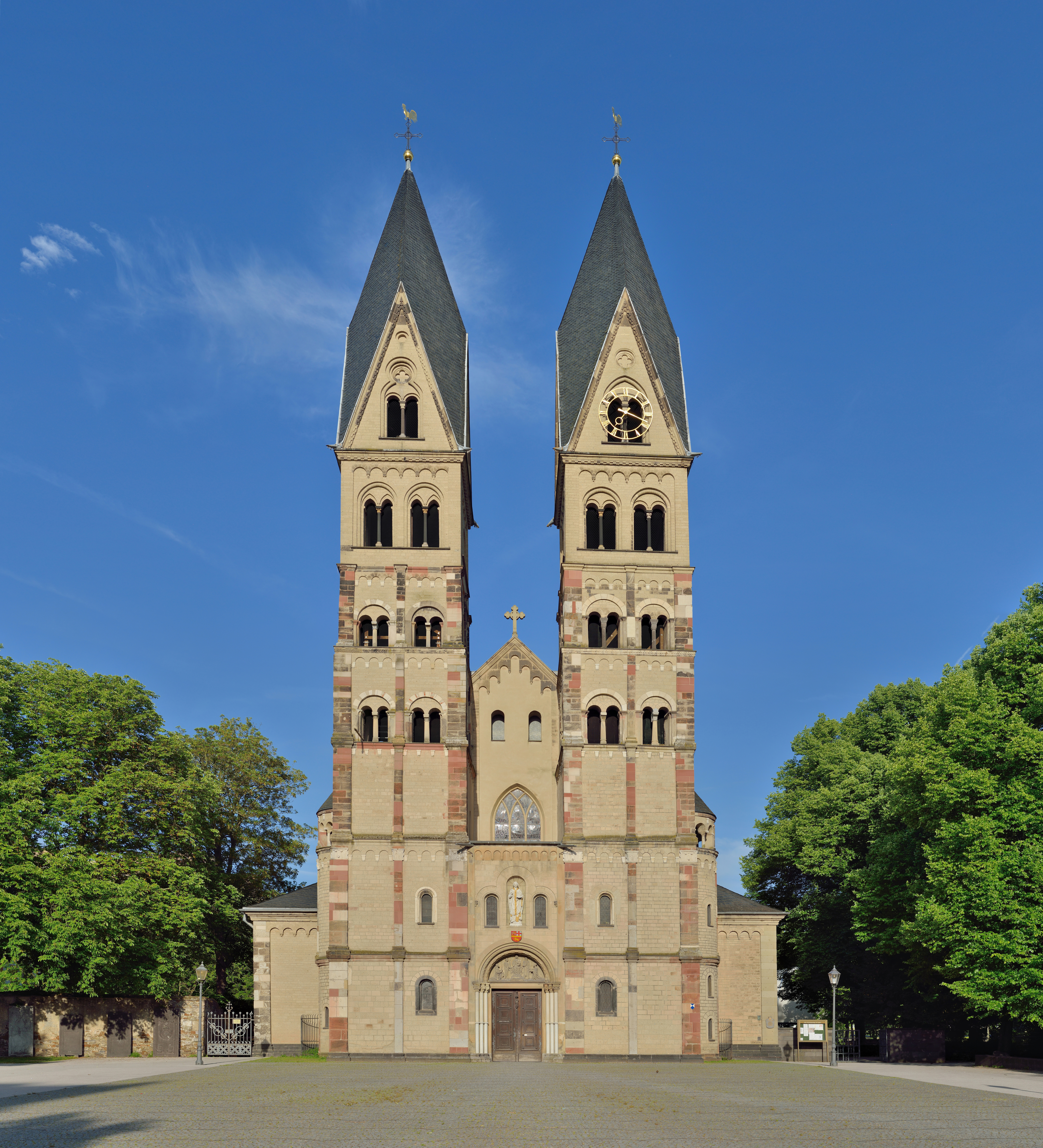
One of the oldest surviving church building in the World Heritage area, the Basilica of St. Castor in Koblenz

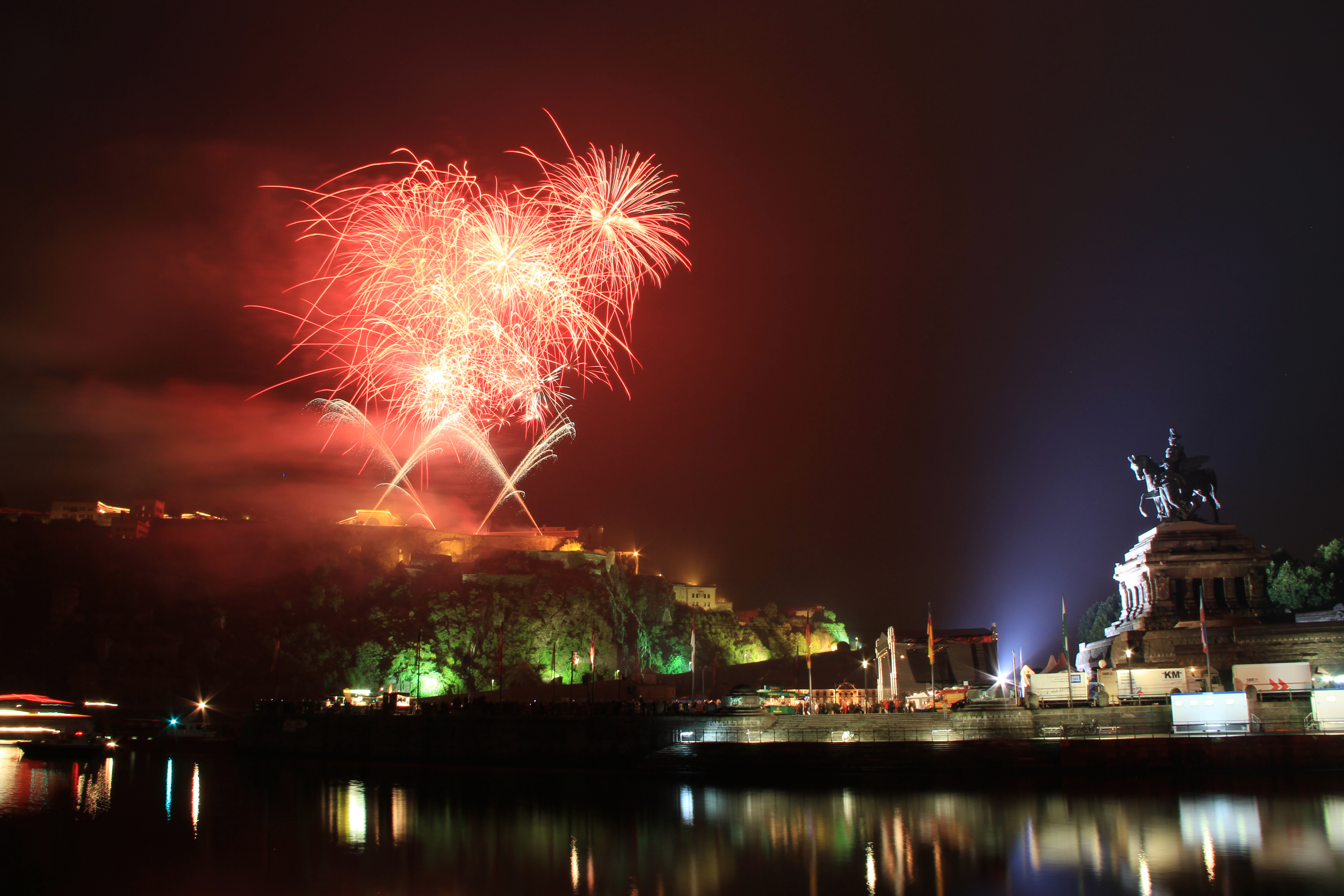
Rhein in Flammen in 2011, before the Ehrenbreitstein Fortress at Koblenz

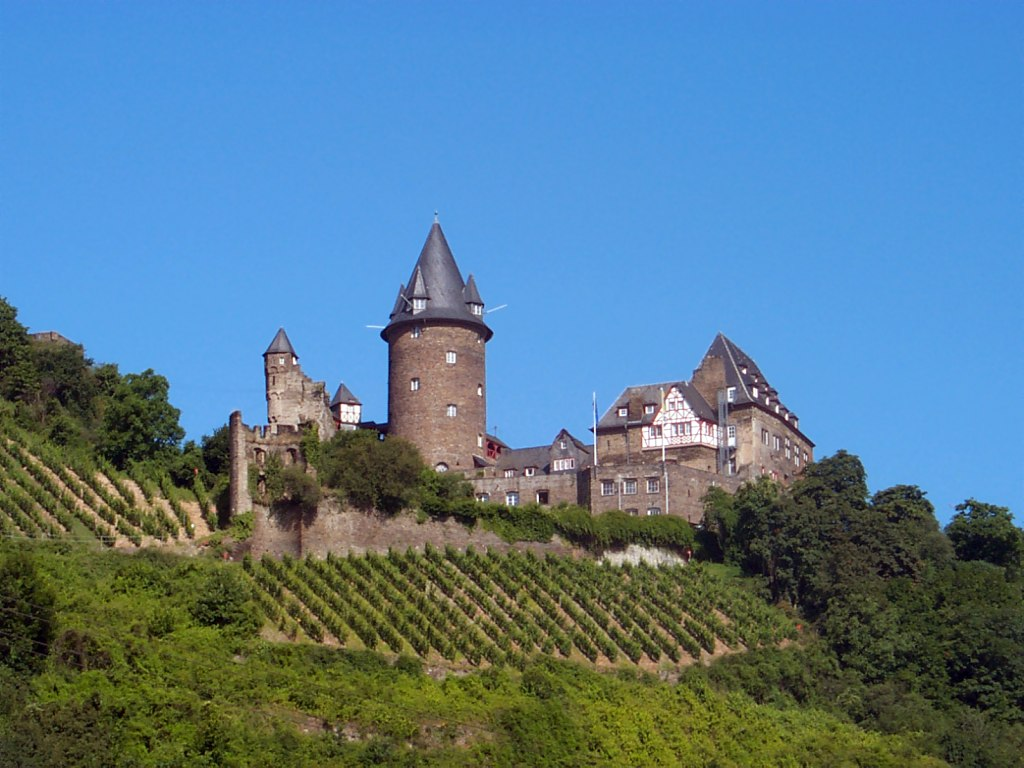
Burg Stahleck Castle

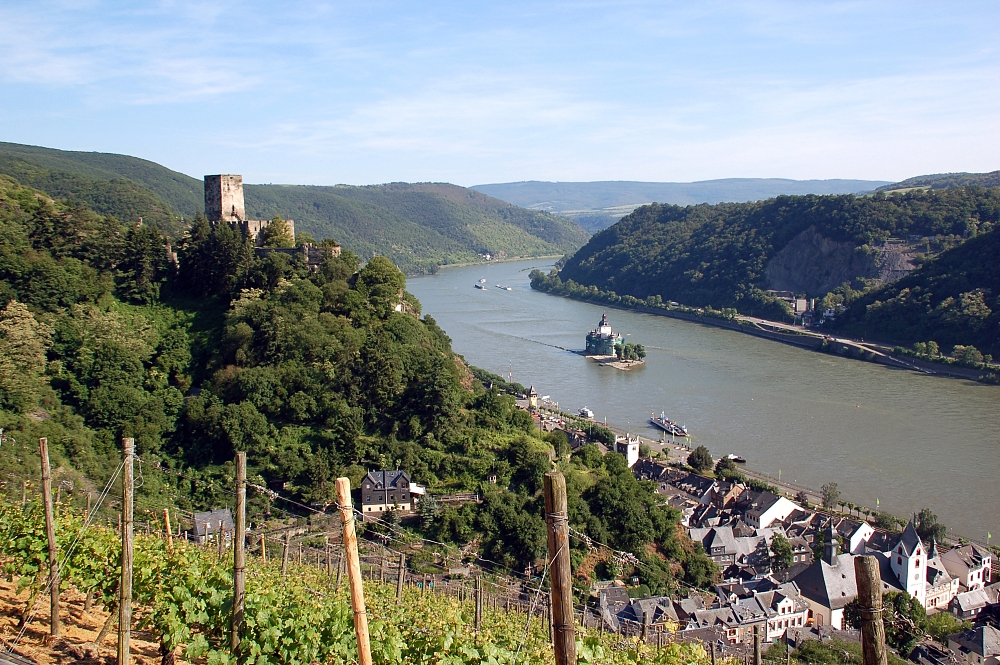
Middle Rhine Valley at Kaub

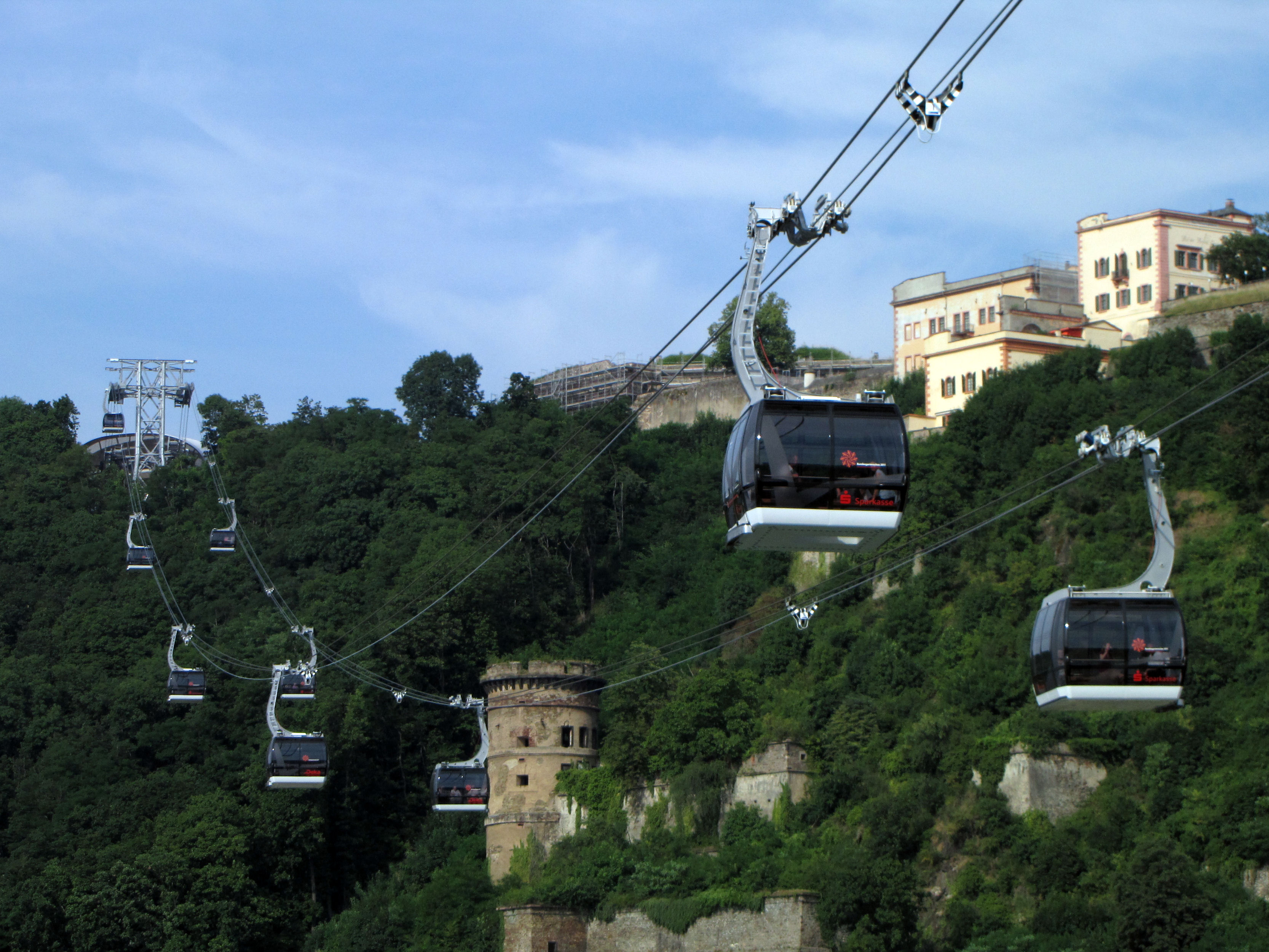
Rhine Cable Railway at Koblenz

A commemorative 100 Euro gold coin issued by the Federal Republic of Germany in 2015
Rhine Gorge between Trechtingshausen and Bacharach

== See also ==
- Köln-Düsseldorfer
- List of canyons
