= Johann Mayer (serial killer) =

German serial killer

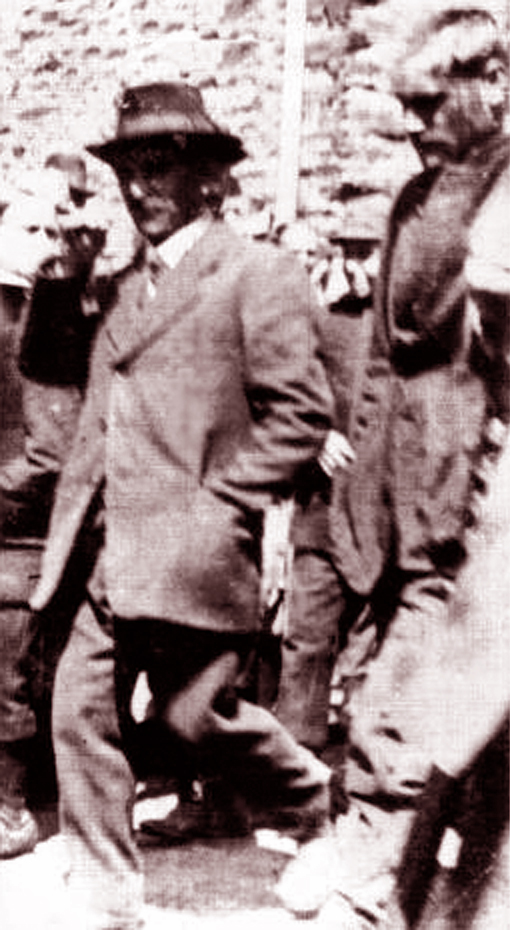
- The murderer named "Stumpfarm", Johann Mayer (1866-1923), to the right of the picture immediately after his arrest in 1922.
- Born: 2 April 1886; Uersfeld, North Rhine-Westphalia, German Empire
- Died: 29 December 1923 (aged 37); Cologne, Rhineland-Palatinate, Weimar Republic
- Cause of death: Execution by guillotine
- Other name: "Stumpfarm"
- Status: Executed
- Convictions: Murder (4 counts); Manslaughter
- Penalty: Death

Details
- Victims: 5
- Span of crimes: 1918–1919
- Country: Germany
- Date apprehended: 10 August 1922

Johann Mayer (2 April 1886 – 29 December 1923), nicknamed Stumpfarm, was a German serial killer, who was sentenced to death for fourfold murders and one manslaughter.

== Life ==
Mayer was born in Uersfeld, the son of Gunderath-born non-sedentary day labourer Johann Wilhelm Mayer and his wife Anna Maria (née Knorr). The place of birth in which Mayer was first baptized on his birthday and regularly baptized the next day, was rather coincidental, as his travelling parents did not have a permanent home. As a child, Mayer attended the school in Boos, before he started work in a quarry. Due to an accident in the quarry - possibly through careless handling - Mayer lost his left forearm, which earned him the nickname "Stumpfarm", even before his criminal career began. Since then he was only partially able to work as a farmhand and harvest helper.

At the time of the First World War, Mayer, who was incapable of military service, increasingly fell into an unsteady lifestyle. He committed murder in the woods between Elzbach and Endert, but was also given penalties for assault, theft and poaching.

== Crimes ==
From March 1918 to May 1919, Mayer killed three women with whom he had previous relationships, as well as two men, with whom he had previously been friends.

- Maria Dahm from Mayen, 23 years old, murdered between 18 and 24 March 1918 in the Mayen town forest.
- Maria Falk from Bonn, 28 years old, murdered in February 1919 in the forest between Masburg and Hauroth.
- Nikolaus Schüller from Kalenborn, 30 years old, murdered on 30 March 1919, in the forest near Mannebach.
- Lorenz Reuter from Masburg, 22 years old, murdered on 26 April 1919, in the forest district of Etscheid between Boos and Mannebach.
- Katharina Forst from Mannebach-Sickerath, 34-year-old widow with three children, who disappeared in May 1919 and whose body was found more than a year later in the forest near Illerich.

As a murder weapon, Mayer used a carbine, and in later interrogations, he described the crimes with "A shot, a scream, all over." To disguise his actions, he separated the heads and limbs of his male victims and exchanged them.

The well-known "Stumpfarm" was investigated on 9 July 1919, but remained undetected working as a farmhand in Eulgem. However, on 10 August 1922, he was recognized and accosted by vagrants in the Sänger district northwest of the village. The prisoner was first detained in Kaisersesch, then moved to Koblenz.

== Condemnation ==
Since Johann Mayer did not confess before the Koblenz jury court, he was sentenced to death on 7 February 1923, for fourfold murder and because of the one manslaughter - 15 years imprisonment. A confession was filed by "Stumpfarm" shortly before his execution after mercy petitions were rejected. The death sentence against Mayer was enforced on 29 December 1923, in the courtyard of the Cologne prison, where he was decapitated by the guillotine.

== See also ==
- List of German serial killers

== Literature ==
- „Stumpfarm“ left a bloody trail, Trierischer Volksfreund No. 221 from 21./22. September 1996.
- Helmut Müller: The Stumpfarm – a poacher, stray and murderer. From the life of Eifel Schinderhannes. Plaidt 2008, ISBN 978-3-938649-36-7.
