= Zettingen =

- Municipality
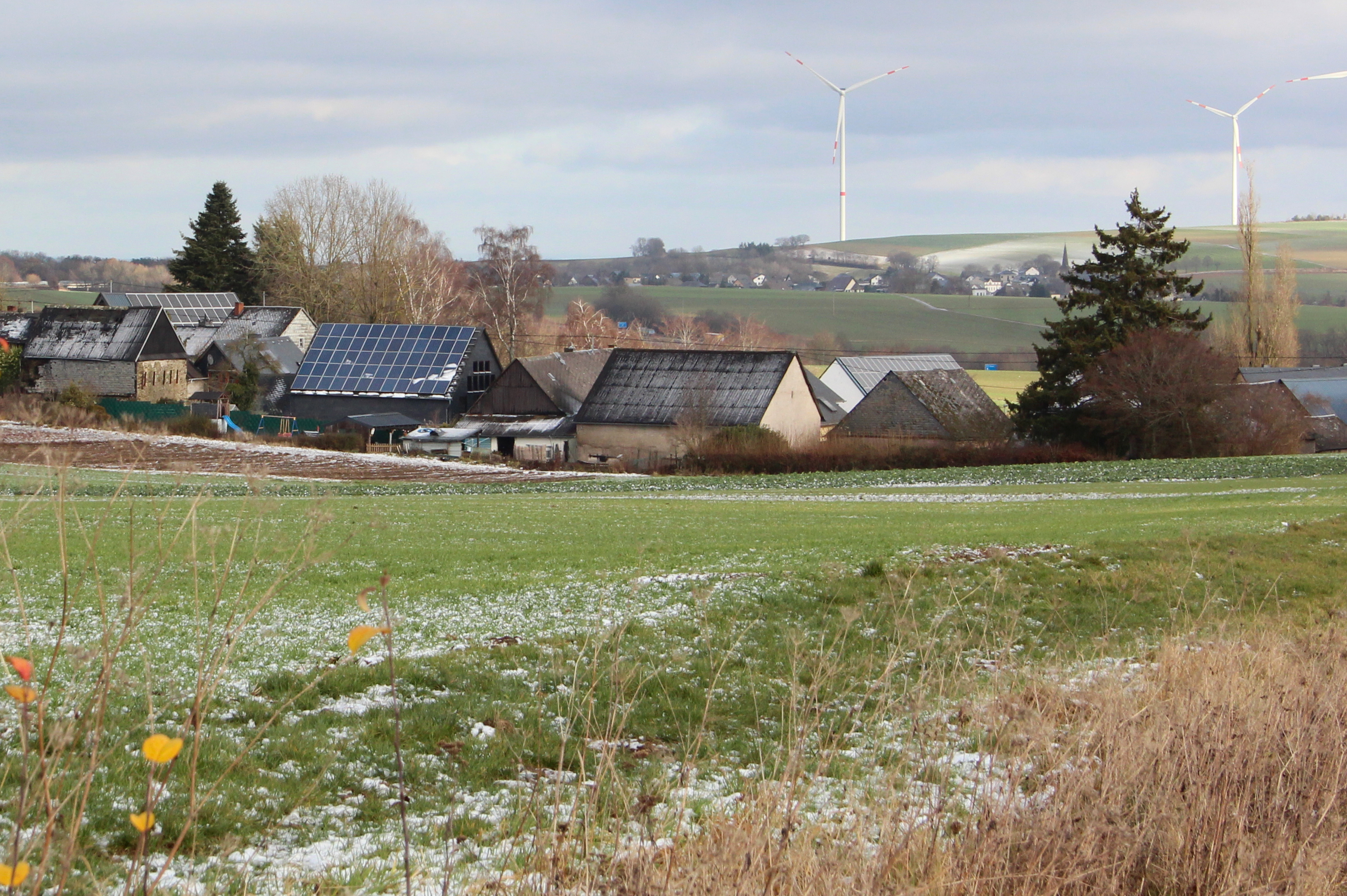

- Coat of arms

- Location of Zettingen within Cochem-Zell district
- Interactive map of Zettingen
- Location within Germany Location within Rhineland-Palatinate
- Coordinates: 50°13′50″N 7°11′59″E
- Country: Germany
- State: Rhineland-Palatinate
- District: Cochem-Zell
- Municipal assoc.: Kaisersesch

Government
  - Mayor (2019–24): Johannes Hammes

Area
  - Total: 3.70 km^{2} (1.43 sq mi)
- Elevation: 378 m (1,240 ft)

Population (2025-12-31)
  - Total: 282
  - Density: 76.2/km^{2} (197/sq mi)
- Time zone: UTC+01:00 (CET)
  - Summer (DST): UTC+02:00 (CEST)
- Postal codes: 56761
- Dialling codes: 02653
- Vehicle registration: COC
- Website: www.zettingen.de

Zettingen is an Ortsgemeinde – a municipality belonging to a Verbandsgemeinde, a kind of collective municipality – in the Cochem-Zell district in Rhineland-Palatinate, Germany. It belongs to the Verbandsgemeinde of Kaisersesch, whose seat is in the like-named town.

== Geography ==
=== Location ===
The municipality lies in the Eifel, on the Autobahn A 48, just across Landesstraße (State Road) 108 from Hambuch.

=== Extent of municipal area ===
The municipality of Zettingen has a total area of 3.70 km^{2}, of which 2.84 km^{2} is cropland and 0.15 km^{2} is wooded.

== History ==
In 1267, Zettingen had its first documentary mention. Archaeological finds in and around the village have, however, led to the conclusion that the area was already settled by the Romans.

In the 13th century, the Archbishops of Trier managed to bring into their ownership the so-called “treasury” of Klotten with its outlying countryside, within which lay Zettingen. On 1 October 1251, Archbishop of Trier Arnold II of Isenburg assumed the parish church in Hambuch with its branch churches with approval from the patron of the Rosenthal Monastery community.

Beginning in 1350, Zettingen belonged to the Mädburg Monastery in the Elz valley near Kehrig. After the monastery was dissolved, the landholdings passed to the parish of Kehrig.

In the 15th century, the Lords of Burgbrohl owned an estate in Zettingen that later passed to Georg von der Leyen and Dietrich von Braunsberg. The Lords of Burgbrohl also held the Vogtei as well as the chicken and goose interest. Furthermore, the collegiate foundation at Karden owned meadows, cropland and wild land in Zettingen. In 1804 and 1806, however, once the French had taken over in 1794, these holdings were auctioned off. This was also done in 1808 with all lands held by the Rosenthal Monastery, which lay near Binningen in the Pommerbach valley.

In 1815 Zettingen was assigned to the Kingdom of Prussia at the Congress of Vienna. Since 1946, it has been part of the then newly founded state of Rhineland-Palatinate. Zettingen early on belonged to what was then the Amt of Kaisersesch, and since 1969 it has been part of the Verbandsgemeinde of Kaisersesch.

== Politics ==
=== Municipal council ===
The council is made up of 6 council members, who were elected by majority vote at the municipal election held on 7 June 2009, and the honorary mayor as chairman.

=== Mayor ===
Zettingen's mayor is Johannes Hammes.

=== Coat of arms ===
The municipality's arms might be described thus: Per pall reversed dexter vert a Roman urn argent, sinister azure a fleur-de-lis Or, and in base Or a plough of the first.

The urn refers to the village's Roman beginnings, which are inferred from finds made in 1927 of potsherds of Roman origin in various places in Zettingen. The lily stands as a symbol of the Mother of God (Mater admirabilis), the church's patron saint. The plough stands for the importance of agriculture to the municipality down to the present day. This coat of arms also graces the municipal flag, which was introduced in 1993 and which is raised at all festivals in the municipality.

The arms have been borne since 1986.

== Culture and sightseeing ==
=== Buildings ===
The following are listed buildings or sites in Rhineland-Palatinate’s Directory of Cultural Monuments:

- Mother of God Catholic Parish Church (Pfarrkirche Muttergottes), Kirchstraße 4 – Baroque Revival aisleless church, 1923, architect Joseph Mockenhaupt, Mayen
- Ackerstraße 5 – estate complex, 19th century; whole complex
- Brunnenstraße/corner of Ackerstraße and Kirchstraße – wayside cross, 18th century
- Kirchstraße 3 – timber-frame house, partly solid, 18th century
- On Kreisstraße (District Road) 23 going towards Hambuch – wayside cross, marked 1816

== Economy and infrastructure ==
=== Public institutions ===
Since 1982, the municipality of Zettingen has been running, along with the neighbouring municipalities of Brachtendorf, Gamlen and Kaifenheim, a three-group kindergarten in Kaifenheim, which in 2003 was expanded by one group and enlarged with a multipurpose room.
