= Treis-Karden (Verbandsgemeinde) =

Former municipality in Rhineland-Palatinate, Germany

Coordinates: 50.178°N 7.302°E

Treis-Karden is a former Verbandsgemeinde ("collective municipality") in Rhineland-Palatinate, Germany. It was disbanded in July 2014.

The Verbandsgemeinde of Treis-Karden consisted of the following Ortsgemeinden ("local municipalities"):

1. Binningen
2. Brieden
3. Brohl
4. Dünfus
5. Forst (Eifel)
6. Kail
7. Lahr
8. Lieg
9. Lütz
10. Möntenich
11. Mörsdorf
12. Moselkern
13. Müden (Mosel)
14. Pommern
15. Roes
16. Treis-Karden
17. Zilshausen
