= Brohl =

- Municipality
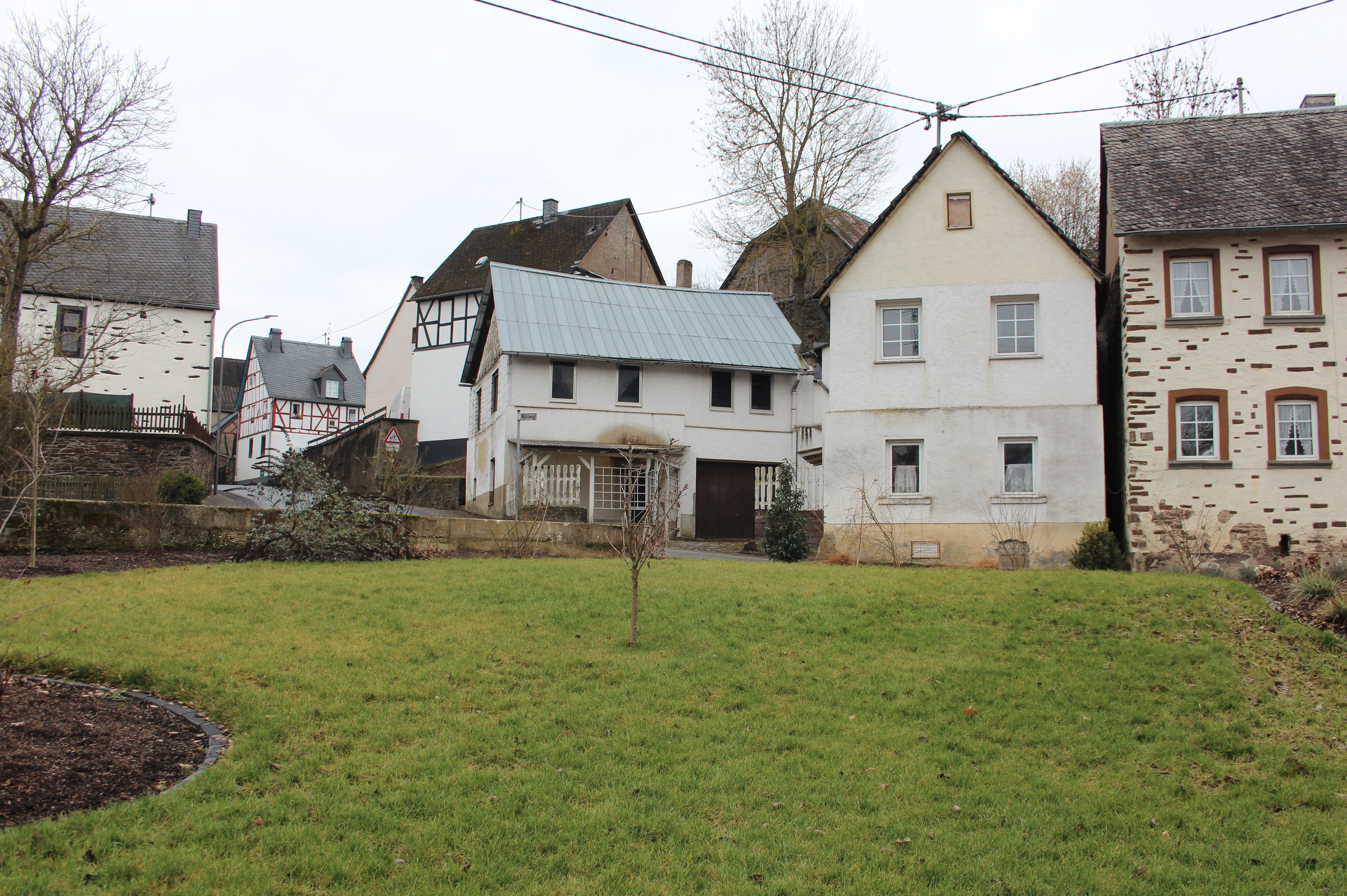

- Coat of arms

- Location of Brohl within Cochem-Zell district
- Interactive map of Brohl
- Location within Germany Location within Rhineland-Palatinate
- Coordinates: 50°13′10″N 7°16′47″E
- Country: Germany
- State: Rhineland-Palatinate
- District: Cochem-Zell
- Municipal assoc.: Kaisersesch

Government
  - Mayor (2019–24): Uwe Theobald

Area
  - Total: 5.88 km^{2} (2.27 sq mi)
- Elevation: 240 m (790 ft)

Population (2025-12-31)
  - Total: 350
  - Density: 60/km^{2} (150/sq mi)
- Time zone: UTC+01:00 (CET)
  - Summer (DST): UTC+02:00 (CEST)
- Postal codes: 56754
- Dialling codes: 02672
- Vehicle registration: COC
- Website: www.brohl-eifel.de

Brohl is an Ortsgemeinde – a municipality belonging to a Verbandsgemeinde, a kind of collective municipality – in the Cochem-Zell district in Rhineland-Palatinate, Germany. It belongs to the Verbandsgemeinde of Kaisersesch.

== Geography ==
Brohl is a small village in the Eifel. Through the municipality flows the Brohlbach, which empties into the Moselle at Karden. Nearby lie Treis-Karden on the Moselle, Münstermaifeld, Polch and Mayen. Neighbouring villages are, among others, Roes, Forst and Kaifenheim.

== History ==
In 926, Brohl had its first documentary mention as Brula, and was then under the ownership of St. Maximin's Abbey in Trier. The Brohl high court belonged to the Pellenzgerichte (“Pellenz Courts”), which in 1696 were taken into Electoral-Trier ownership. In 1711, Brohl was granted to the Schenk (a noble title, historically meaning something akin to “steward”) of Schmidtburg. Beginning in 1794, Brohl lay under French rule. In 1815 it was assigned to the Kingdom of Prussia at the Congress of Vienna. Since 1946, it has been part of the then newly founded state of Rhineland-Palatinate.

== Politics ==
=== Municipal council ===
The council is made up of 8 council members, who were elected by majority vote at the municipal election held on 7 June 2009, and the honorary mayor as chairman.

=== Mayor ===
Brohl's mayor is Uwe Theobald.

=== Coat of arms ===
The German blazon reads: In Grün ein goldener Bischofsstab, schrägrechts aus dem Schildrand wachsend, begleitet oben von einer silbernen Schnalle, unten von einem silbernem Eichenreis.

The municipality's arms might in English heraldic language be described thus: Vert issuant from base sinister a bishop's staff bendwise Or between in chief sinister a buckle argent and in base dexter an oak sprig slipped bendwise sinister of the same.

The main charge, the bishop's staff, is Saint Nicholas’s attribute, thus representing the municipality's and the church's patron saint. He is believed to have held this honour since 1288. The staff also appears in the 1763 Brohl court seal, as does the buckle, once borne as an armorial device by the Schenk of Schmidtburg, who held the court as an Electoral-Trier fief. The oak sprig stands for the widespread growth of oaktrees in the outlying countryside.

The arms have been borne since 21 May 1986.

== Culture and sightseeing ==
=== Buildings ===
The following are listed buildings or sites in Rhineland-Palatinate’s Directory of Cultural Monuments:

- Saint Nicholas’s Catholic Church (branch church; Filialkirche St. Nikolaus), Hohlstraße/corner of Neugasse – Romanesque (?) tower from 1578; aisleless church from 1766, architect J. A. Neurohr, Trier, outside above the portal a Crucifixion group; church renovations completed in 2006; at the church a wayside cross, 17th century; 3 grave crosses, 17th century; 2 grave crosses, 18th century
- Hauptstraße – at the bridge over the Brohlbach a fragment of a wayside cross, niche type, from 1666
- Hauptstraße 16 – estate complex, earlier half of 19th century, building with half-hipped roof; whole complex with stable-barn and courtyard gate
- Hauptstraße 20 – former school from about 1870
- Hauptstraße 32 – solid building, early 19th century
- Neugasse 1 – timber-frame house, partly solid, from 1783
- Heiligenhäuschen (a small, shrinelike structure consecrated to a saint or saints) on Landesstraße (State Road) 109 going towards Roes – 18th century, relief inside, 18th century, beside it a grave cross from 1784
- Chapel, southeast of the village at the Liesenfeldsmühle (mill) – quarrystone building from 1910, five Gothic Revival gypsum figures
- Chapel on Landesstraße 110 going towards Möntenich – plastered building, 18th/19th century
- Milestone on Landesstraße 109 going towards Roes – obelisk, mid 19th century

Also worth seeing are two castles that can be reached in a few hours by hiking. They are Pyrmont and Eltz.

=== Clubs ===
- Brohl volunteer fire brigade
- Carnival club
- Choir
- Music club
- Sport club

== Economy and infrastructure ==
=== Education ===
The municipality has one primary school.

=== Transport ===
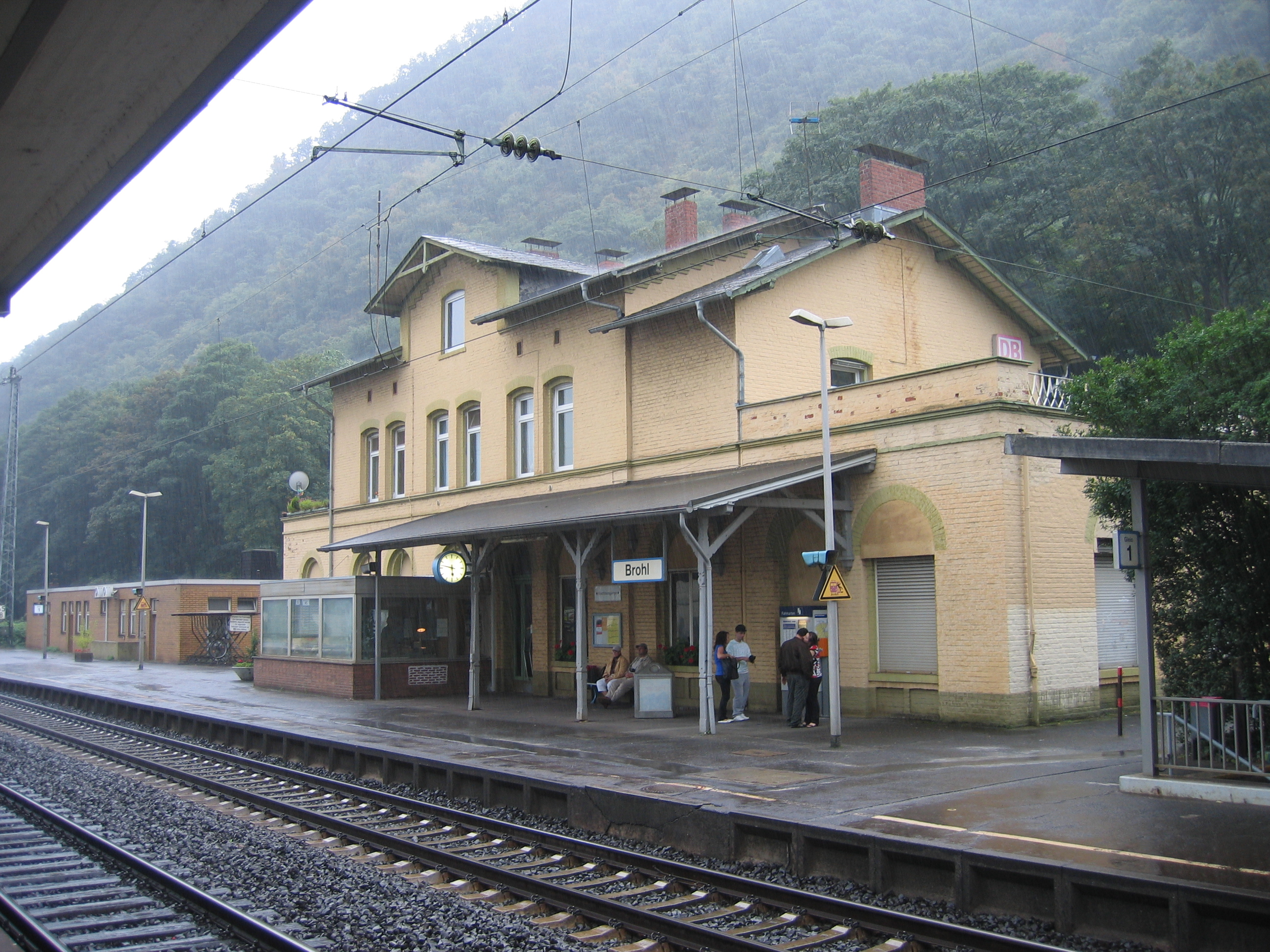
Brohl station

Brohl station is located at Linke Rheinstrecke, served by lines RB26 and RB32 as well as Brohl Valley Railway, which is in service for touristic special train rides of Brohltalbahn e. V., which runs in direction of Laacher See. Brohl is located in the area of the transport association Verkehrsverbund Rhein-Mosel (VRM), in the fare zone number 899.
