= Kaisersesch (Verbandsgemeinde) =

- Verbandsgemeinde
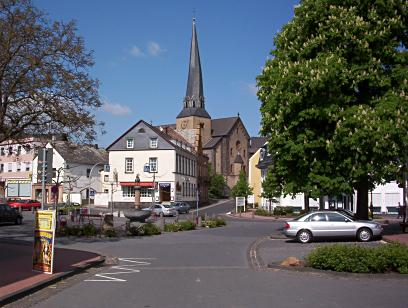
- Kaisersesch

- Location of Kaisersesch within Cochem-Zell district
- Interactive map of Kaisersesch
- Location within Germany Location within Rhineland-Palatinate
- Coordinates: 50°14′N 7°08′E
- Country: Germany
- State: Rhineland-Palatinate
- District: Cochem-Zell
- Seat: Kaisersesch
- Subdivisions: 26 municipalities

Area
  - Total: 140.61 km^{2} (54.29 sq mi)

Population (2025-12-31)
  - Total: 15,880
  - Density: 112.9/km^{2} (292.5/sq mi)
- Time zone: UTC+01:00 (CET)
  - Summer (DST): UTC+02:00 (CEST)
- Website: www.kaisersesch.de

Kaisersesch is a Verbandsgemeinde ("collective municipality") in the district Cochem-Zell, in Rhineland-Palatinate, Germany. The seat of the Verbandsgemeinde is in Kaisersesch. On 1 July 2014 it was expanded with 8 municipalities from the former Verbandsgemeinde Treis-Karden.

The Verbandsgemeinde Kaisersesch consists of the following Ortsgemeinden ("local municipalities"):

1. Binningen
2. Brachtendorf
3. Brieden
4. Brohl
5. Dünfus
6. Düngenheim
7. Eppenberg
8. Eulgem
9. Forst (Eifel)
10. Gamlen
11. Hambuch
12. Hauroth
13. Illerich
14. Kaifenheim
15. Kail
16. Kaisersesch
17. Kalenborn
18. Landkern
19. Laubach
20. Leienkaul
21. Masburg
22. Möntenich
23. Müllenbach
24. Roes
25. Urmersbach
26. Zettingen
