= Eppenberg =

- Municipality
- Coat of arms

- Location of Eppenberg within Cochem-Zell district
- Interactive map of Eppenberg
- Location within Germany Location within Rhineland-Palatinate
- Coordinates: 50°14′55″N 7°4′21″E
- Country: Germany
- State: Rhineland-Palatinate
- District: Cochem-Zell
- Municipal assoc.: Kaisersesch

Government
  - Mayor (2019–24): Nikolaus Braunschädel

Area
  - Total: 4.12 km^{2} (1.59 sq mi)
- Elevation: 500 m (1,600 ft)

Population (2025-12-31)
  - Total: 236
  - Density: 57.3/km^{2} (148/sq mi)
- Time zone: UTC+01:00 (CET)
  - Summer (DST): UTC+02:00 (CEST)
- Postal codes: 56759
- Dialling codes: 02653
- Vehicle registration: COC
- Website: eppenberg.kaisersesch.de

Eppenberg is an Ortsgemeinde – a municipality belonging to a Verbandsgemeinde, a kind of collective municipality – in the Cochem-Zell district in Rhineland-Palatinate, Germany. It belongs to the Verbandsgemeinde of Kaisersesch, whose seat is in the like-named town.

== Geography ==
The municipality lies in the Eifel.

== History ==
Beginning in 1794, Eppenberg lay under French rule. In 1815 it was assigned to the Kingdom of Prussia at the Congress of Vienna. Since 1946, it has been part of the then newly founded state of Rhineland-Palatinate.

== Politics ==
=== Municipal council ===
The council is made up of 6 council members, who were elected by majority vote at the municipal election held on 7 June 2009, and the honorary mayor as chairman.

=== Mayor ===
Eppenberg's mayor is Nikolaus Braunschädel.

== Culture and sightseeing ==
=== Buildings ===
The following are listed buildings or sites in Rhineland-Palatinate’s Directory of Cultural Monuments:

- Near the graveyard – Wayside chapel, plastered building, 19th century; Gothic Revival gypsum Pietà, 20th century

=== Youth ===
Since the summer of 2005, Eppenberg has had a youth centre for all the village's youth, who organize the yearly Walpurgis Night festivities and village festival.

=== Kermis ===
The St.-Anna-Kirmes is held each year on the last weekend in July.
