= Urmersbach =

- Municipality
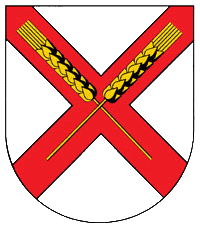
- Coat of arms

- Location of Urmersbach within Cochem-Zell district
- Interactive map of Urmersbach
- Location within Germany Location within Rhineland-Palatinate
- Coordinates: 50°15′27″N 7°7′55″E
- Country: Germany
- State: Rhineland-Palatinate
- District: Cochem-Zell
- Municipal assoc.: Kaisersesch

Government
  - Mayor (2019–24): Thilo Schmitt

Area
  - Total: 4.34 km^{2} (1.68 sq mi)
- Elevation: 420 m (1,380 ft)

Population (2025-12-31)
  - Total: 472
  - Density: 109/km^{2} (282/sq mi)
- Time zone: UTC+01:00 (CET)
  - Summer (DST): UTC+02:00 (CEST)
- Postal codes: 56761
- Dialling codes: 02653
- Vehicle registration: COC
- Website: urmersbach.kaisersesch.de

Urmersbach is an Ortsgemeinde – a municipality belonging to a Verbandsgemeinde, a kind of collective municipality – in the Cochem-Zell district in Rhineland-Palatinate, Germany. It belongs to the Verbandsgemeinde of Kaisersesch, whose seat is in the like-named town.

== Geography ==
=== Location ===
The municipality lies in the Eifel roughly 2 km north of Kaisersesch and 10 km southwest of Mayen.

=== Extent of municipal area ===
In 1787, the area within municipal limits was 361 ha, and in 1789, it was given as 623 Morgen. In 1925, it was quoted as being 433 ha, and today it is slightly bigger at 434 ha.

== History ==
In 1253, Urmersbach had its first documentary mention. Beginning in 1794, it lay under French rule. In 1815 it was assigned to the Kingdom of Prussia at the Congress of Vienna. Since 1946, it has been part of the then newly founded state of Rhineland-Palatinate.

=== Population development ===
The oldest population figure comes from 1612 and gives the village's population as 11 incolae, that is to say, families, which suggests roughly 70 persons. In 1784, Urmersbach counted 233 inhabitants, and by 1910, 508. The population changed very little over the Second World War, falling from 471 in 1939 to 465 in 1950. On 31 December 1999, 229 families were living im Urmersbach, comprising 510 persons, of whom 261 were female and 249 male.

== Politics ==
=== Municipal council ===
The council is made up of 8 council members, who were elected at the municipal election held on 7 June 2009, and the honorary mayor as chairman. The eight seats on council are shared between two voters’ groups.

=== Mayor ===
Urmersbach's mayor isThilo Schmitt, and his deputies are Markus Schröder and Markus Kusterer.

=== Coat of arms ===
The German blazon reads: Das Schild in Silber, darauf ein rotes Andreaskreuz, belegt mit zwei goldenen Ähren.

The municipality's arms might in English heraldic language be described thus: Argent a saltire gules charged with two ears of wheat per saltire Or.

The two crossed ears of wheat stand for both agriculture and the miller's craft, both of which underlay the village's livelihood for centuries.

== Culture and sightseeing ==
=== Buildings ===
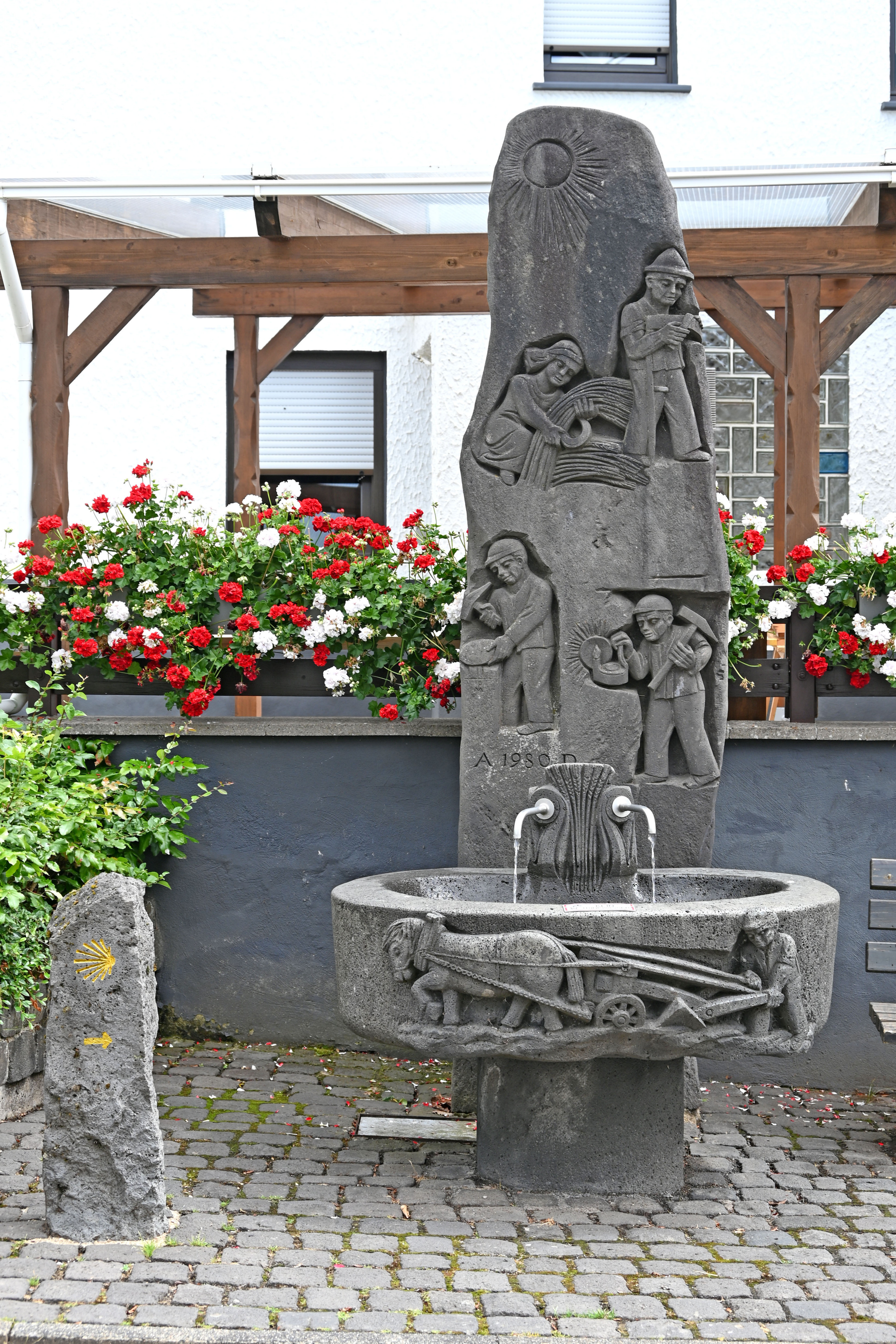
Village fountain

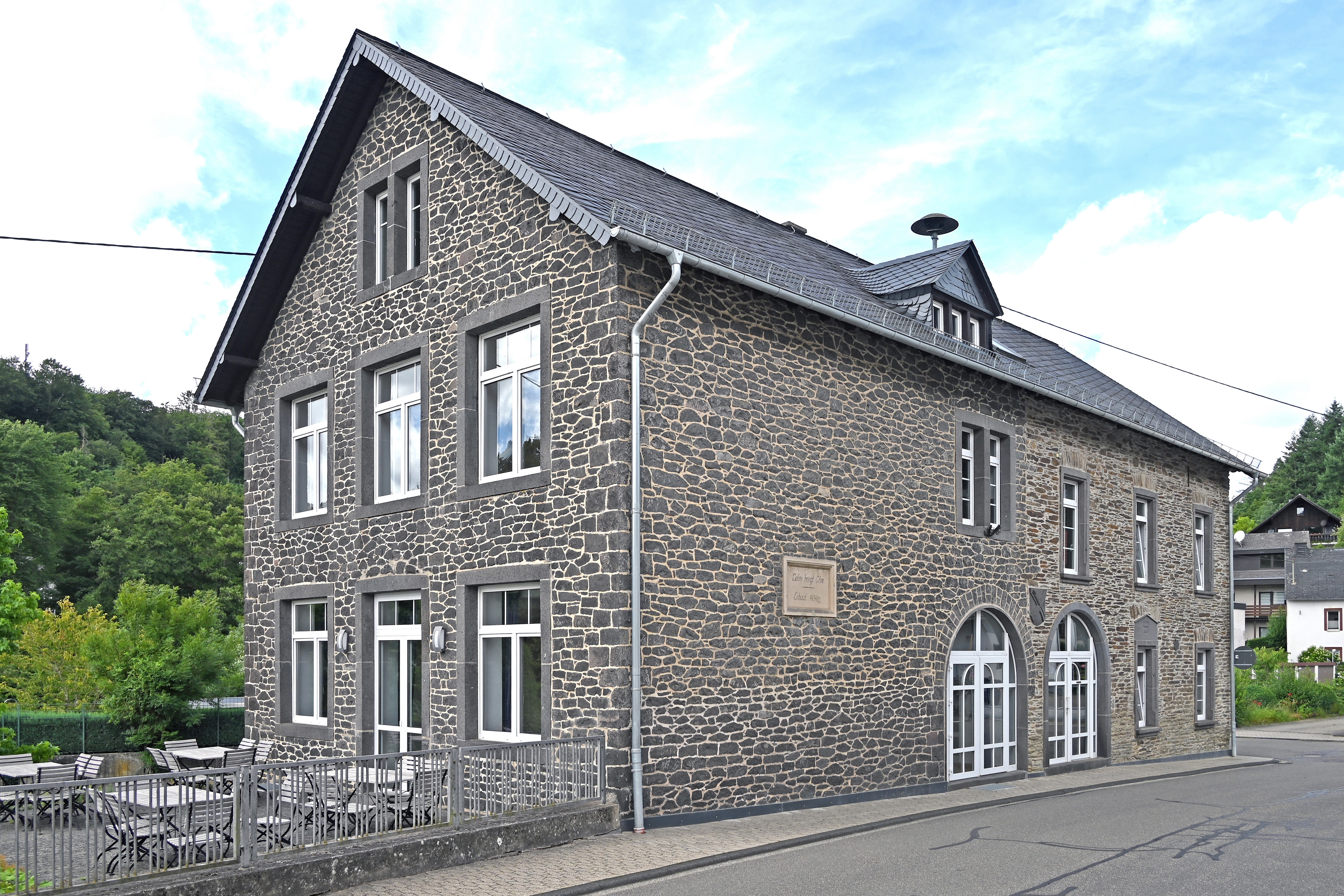
Former school

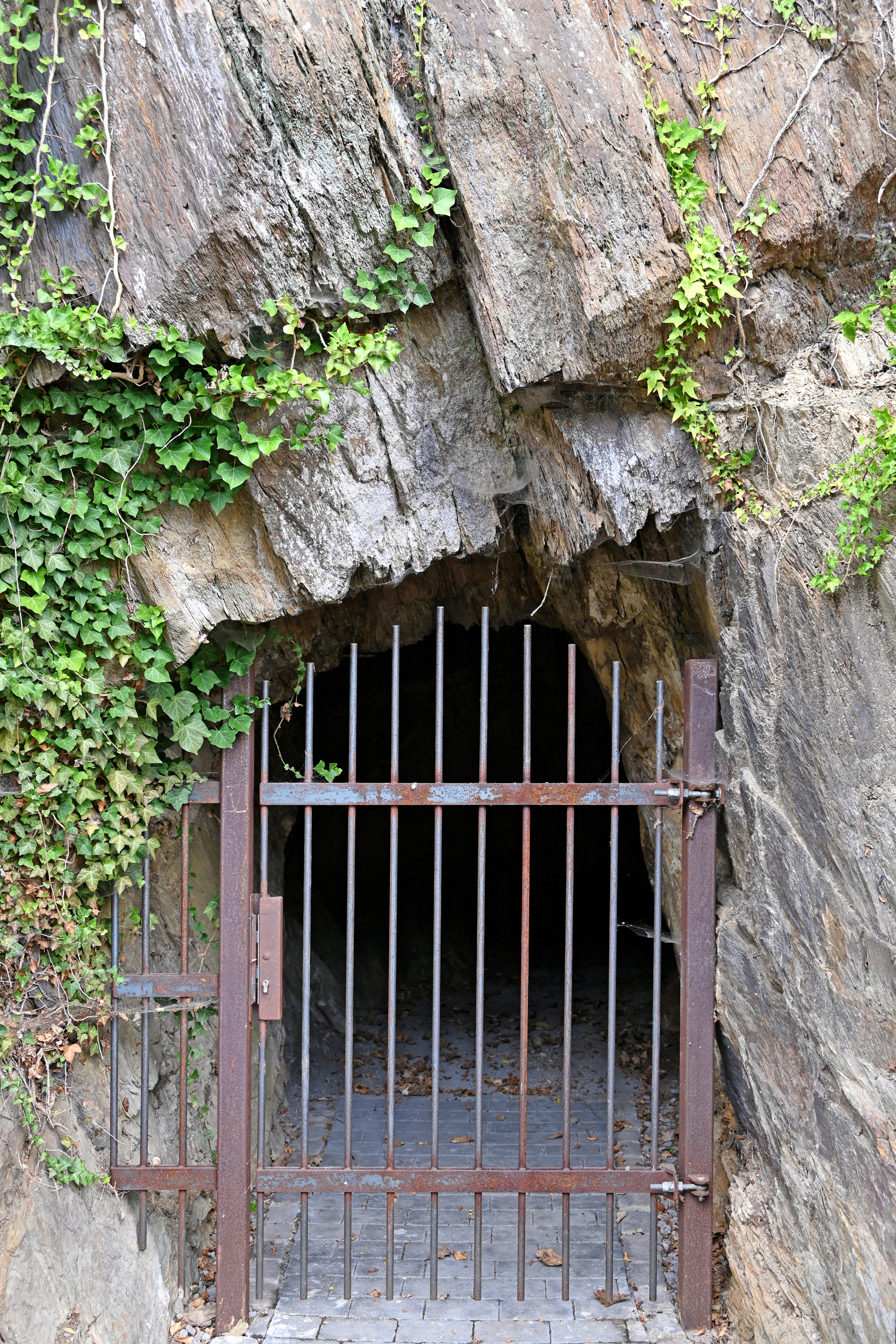
Slate gallery ‘Et Layschje’

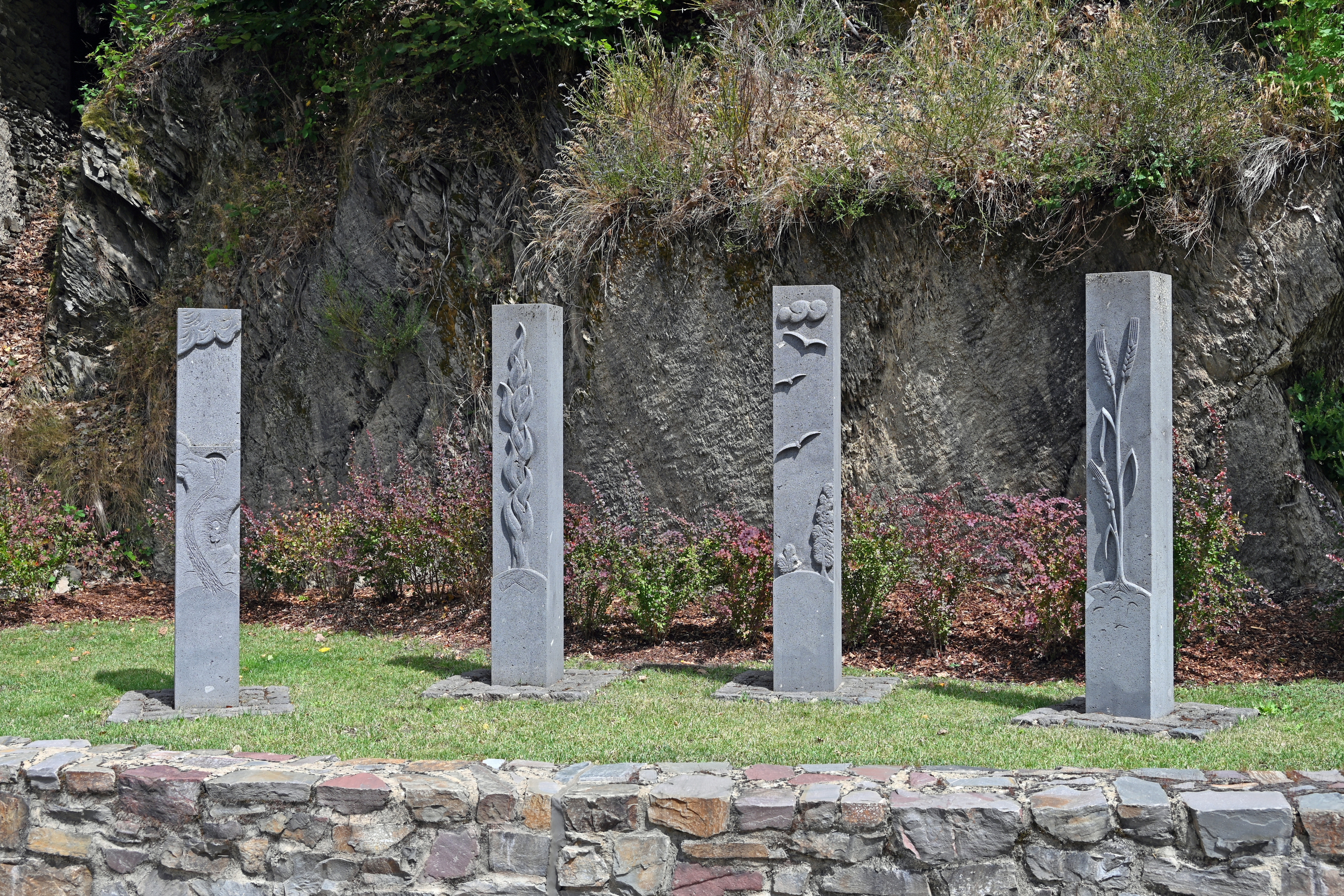
Steles

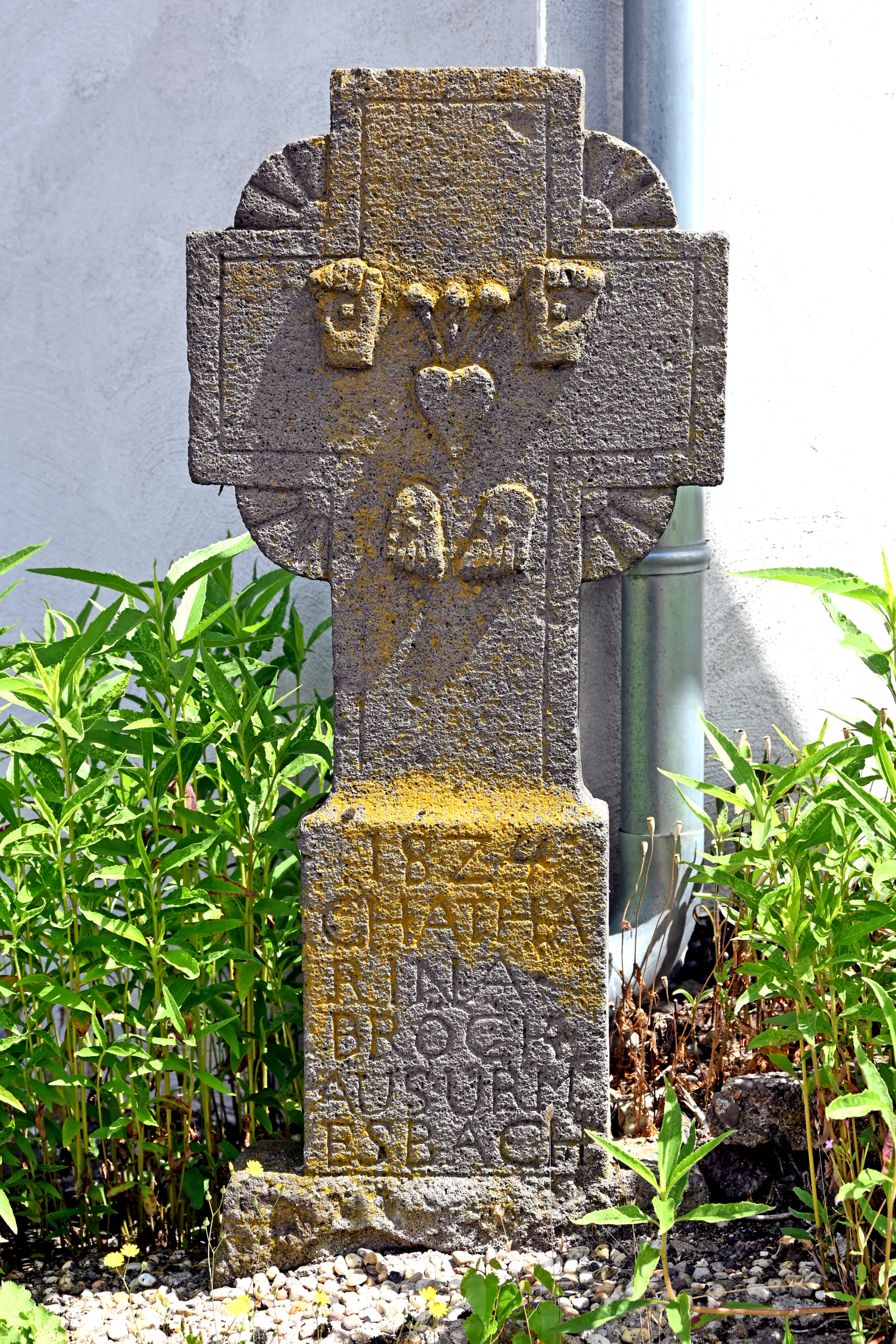
Grave cross from 1824

The following are listed buildings or sites in Rhineland-Palatinate’s Directory of Cultural Monuments:

- Saint Andrew’s Catholic Church (branch church; Filialkirche St. Andreas), Auf'm Henchen – Baroque aisleless church, 1792, expansion 1954
- Hauptstraße 30 – basalt wayside cross, marked 1725
- Hauptstraße 32 – basalt fountain, 19th century
- Hauptstraße 51 – grave cross, marked 1824
- Obermühle (“Upper Mill”) – solid building with timber-frame gable, 1906, two smaller barns, millrace

==== Pfarrkirche St. Andreas ====
The history of Saint Andrew's Parish Church (Pfarrkirche St. Andreas) in Urmersbach goes back to a reference in a 1574 Weistum (a Weistum – cognate with English wisdom – was a legal pronouncement issued by men learned in law in the Middle Ages and early modern times). The chapel patron, Saint Andrew, was named for the first time in connection with setting the boundaries of the Polcher Holz (woodland). The chapel itself was first mentioned in 1613. Documents from 1784 describe the chapel as having fallen into disrepair (“zerfallen”). The chapel was rebuilt in 1787. Work ended in 1791. In 1954, the chapel was expanded and renovated to plans by the architect Böhr from Mayen. It retains its resulting form today from that time.

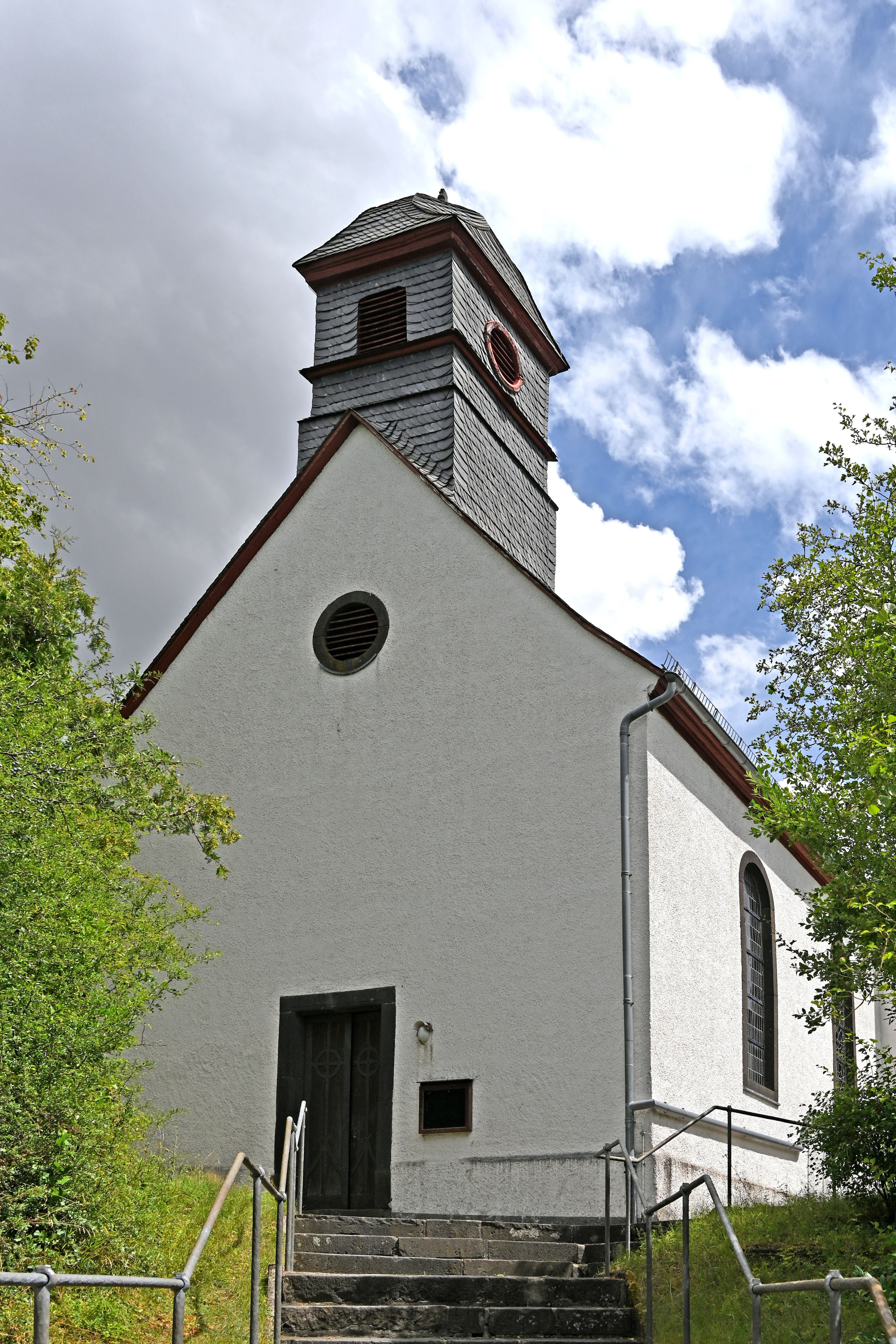
West side

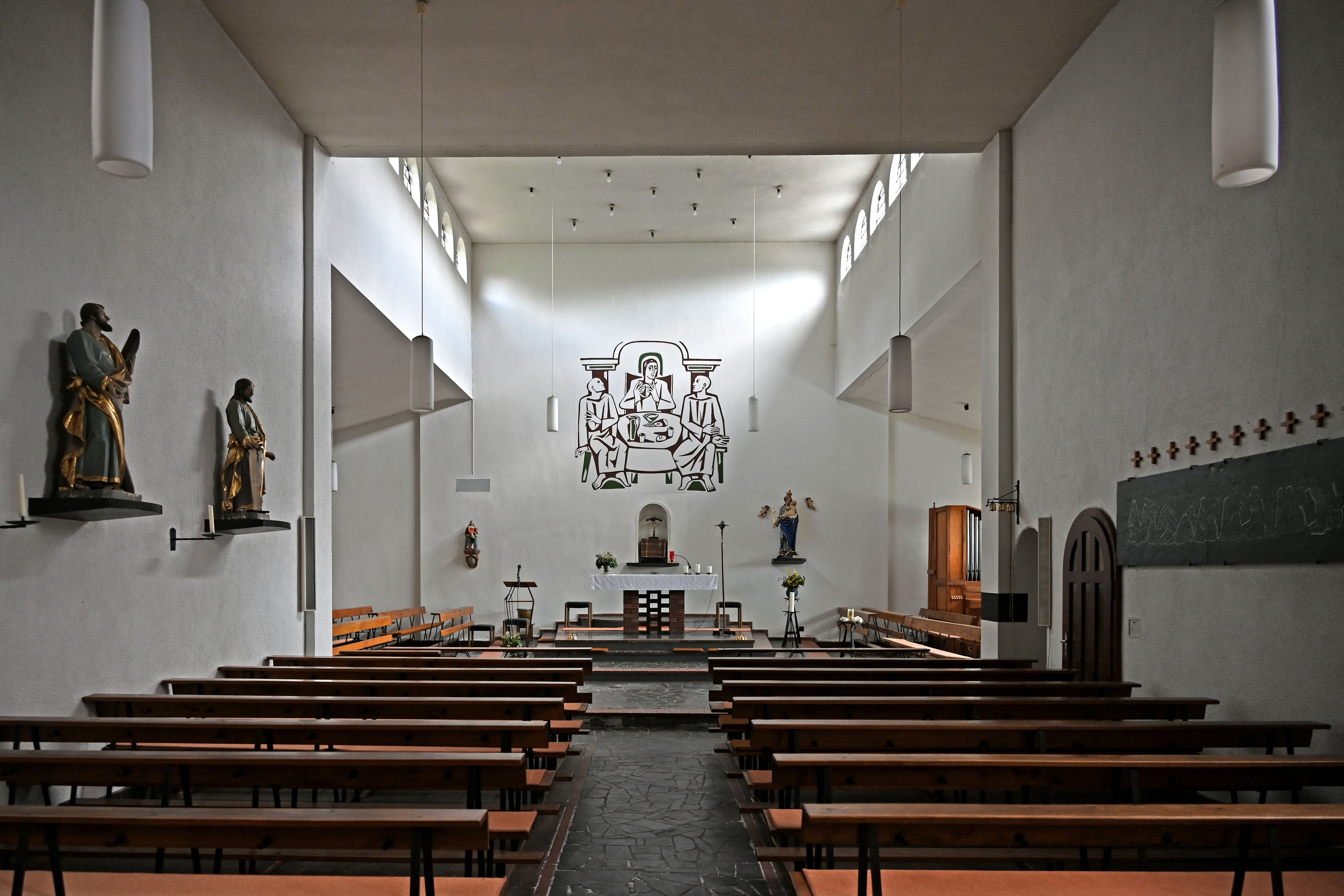
Interior

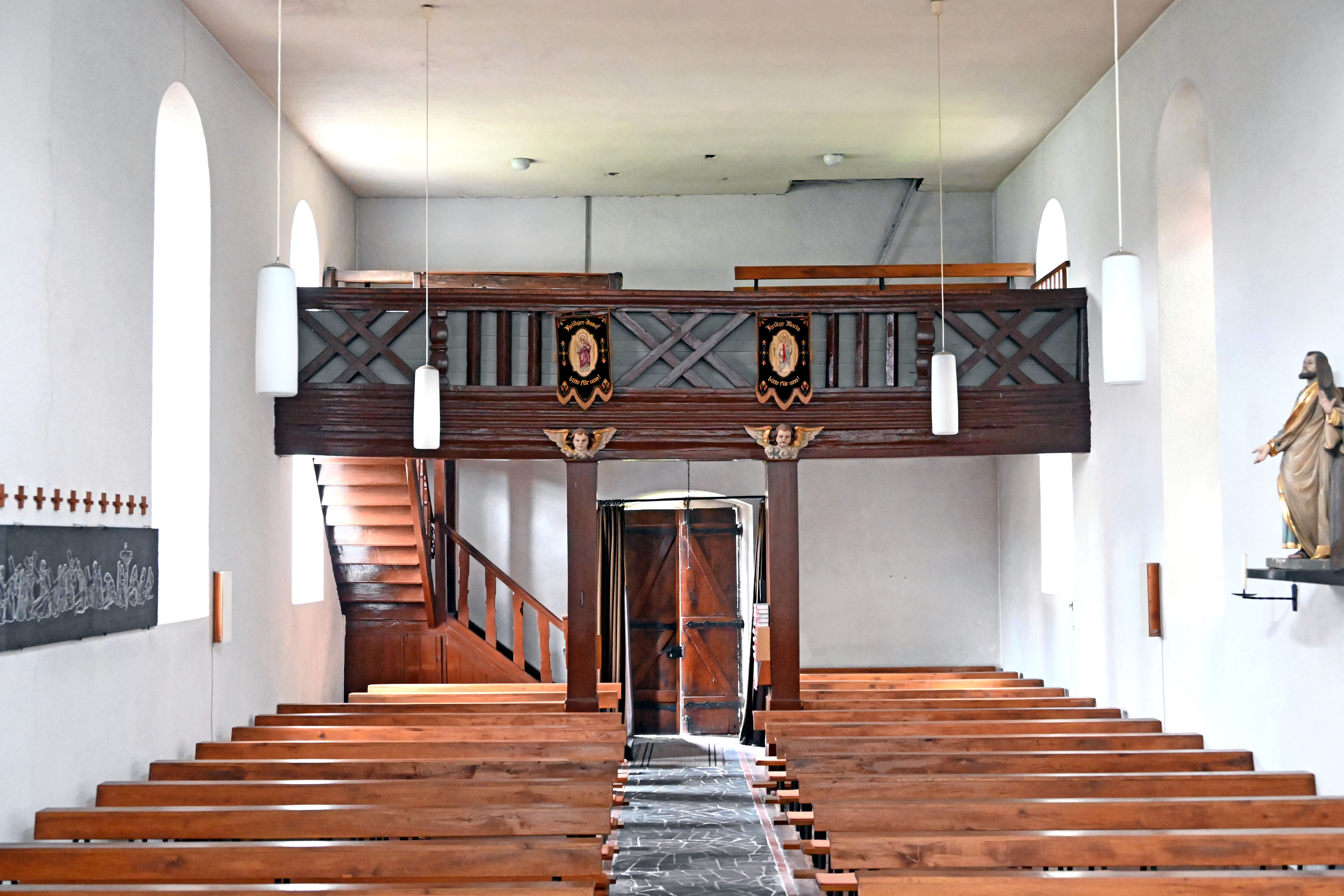
Gallery from 1792

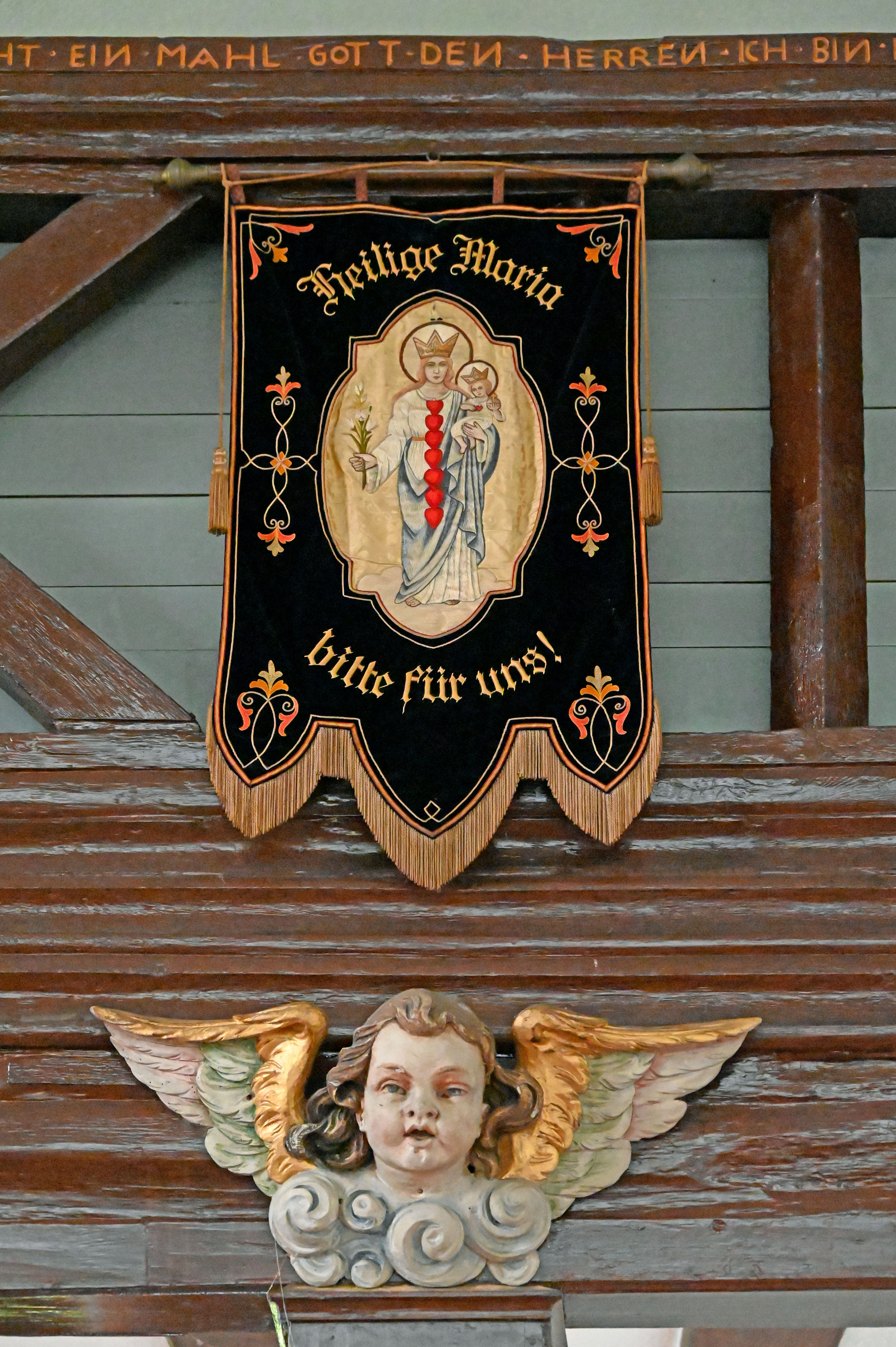
Gallery detail

=== Regular events ===
==== Kirmes ====
The village fair (Dorfkirmes) is held each year in September. The event, organized by the four clubs of the fair association (Kirmesgesellschaft), features, by longstanding tradition, fireworks in the middle of the village on streets closed specially for this purpose.

==== Junggesellenfest ====
Also held each year in September is the traditional Bachelors’ Festival (Junggesellenfest), which is well known far beyond the local area.

== Economy and infrastructure ==
=== Transport ===
On 15 May 1895, Urmersbach was linked to the Eifelquerbahn (Cross Eifel Railway between Andernach and Gerolstein), which still runs through the village today, between Andernach amd Kaisersesch, train servuce is operated by section Lahn-Eifel-Bahn of Deutsche Bahn. Urmersbach is located in the Verkehrsverbund Rhein-Mosel (VRM), zone number 729.

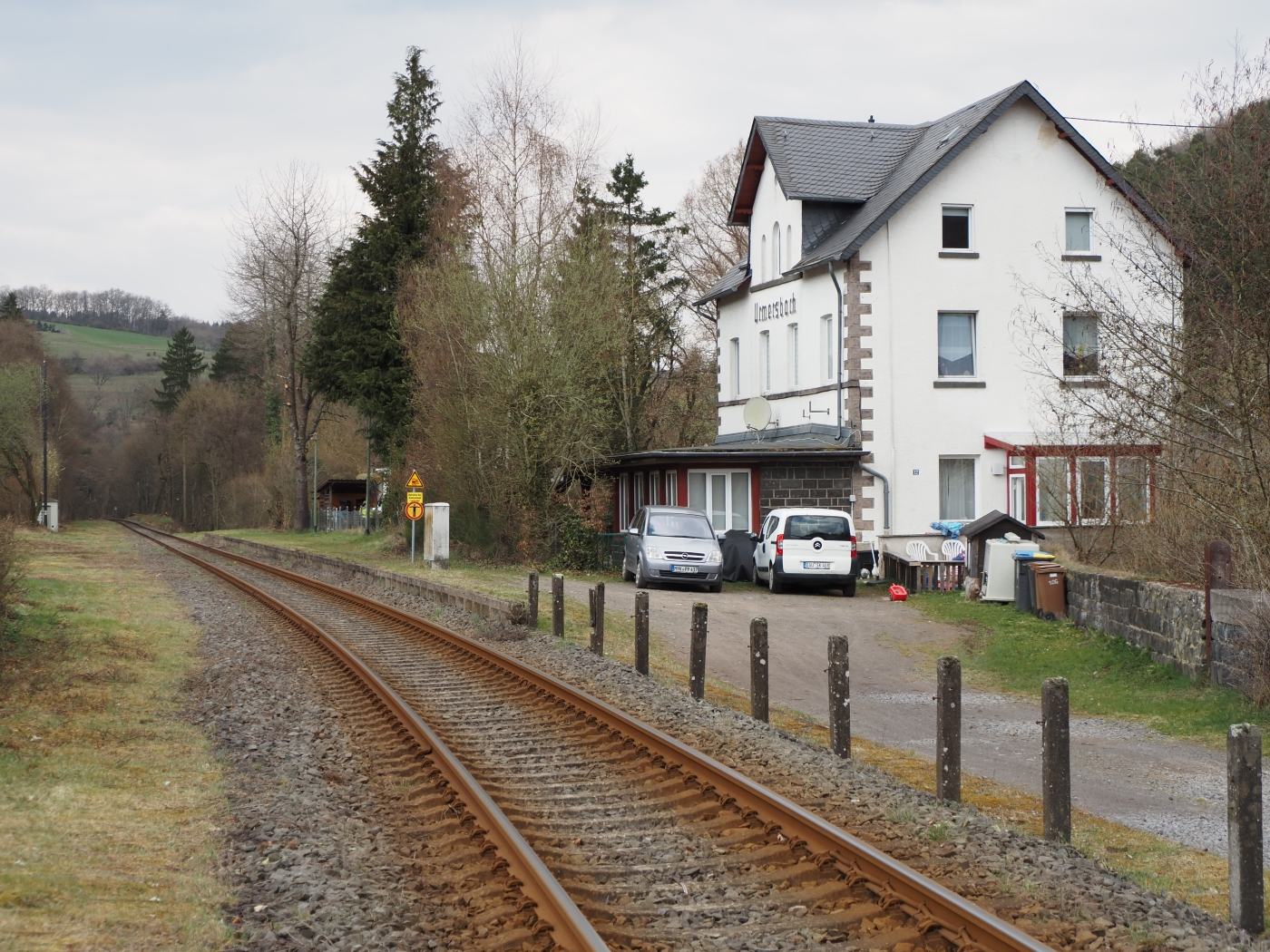
Urmersbach old station

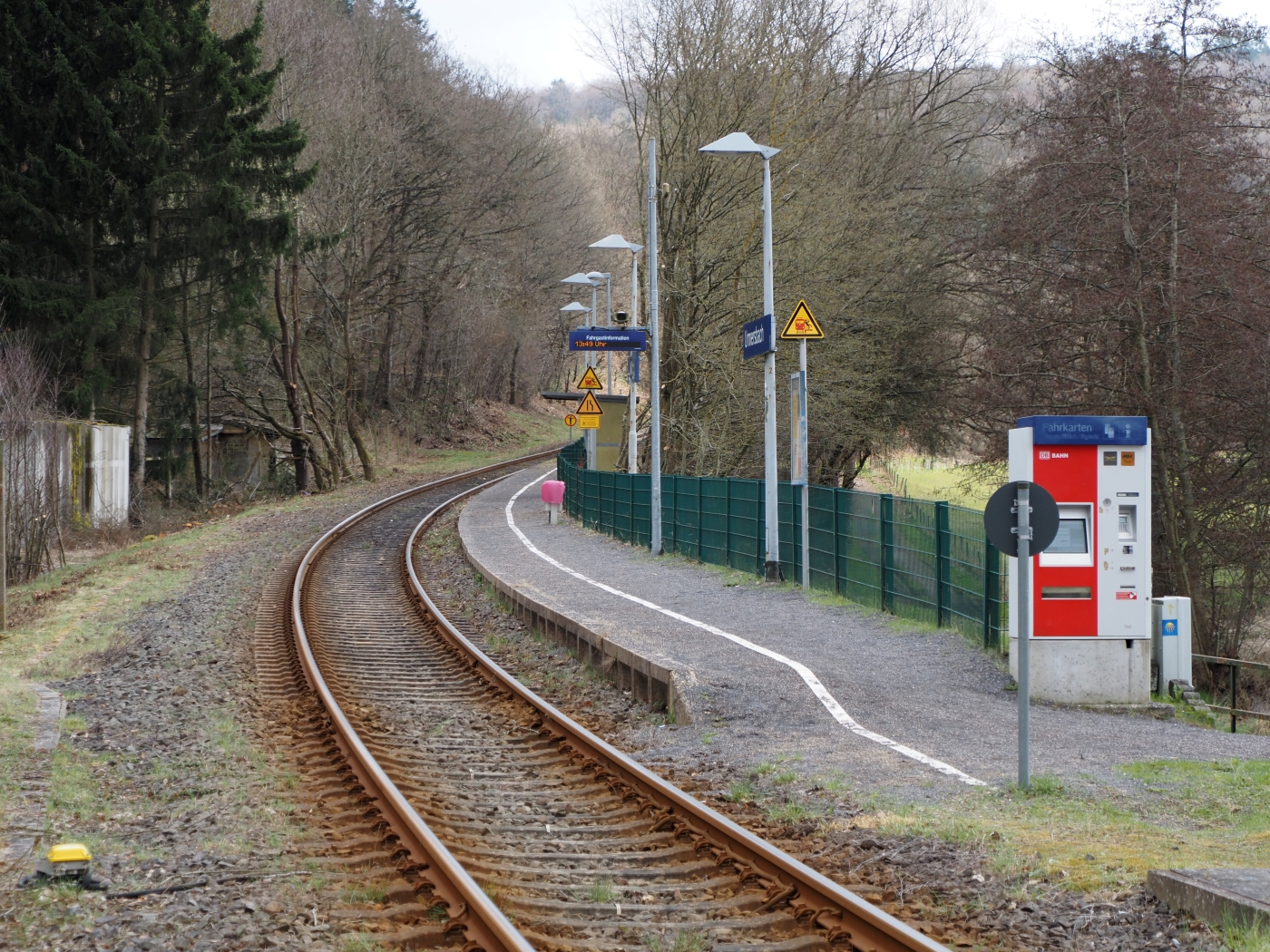
Urmersbach current plattform
