= Roes, Rhineland-Palatinate =

Roes
- Municipality
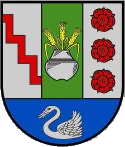
- Coat of arms

- Location of Roes within Cochem-Zell district
- Interactive map of Roes
- Location within Germany Location within Rhineland-Palatinate
- Coordinates: 50°14′46″N 7°15′38″E
- Country: Germany
- State: Rhineland-Palatinate
- District: Cochem-Zell
- Municipal assoc.: Kaisersesch

Government
  - Mayor (2019–24): Jörg Fuhrmann

Area
  - Total: 6.74 km^{2} (2.60 sq mi)
- Elevation: 330 m (1,080 ft)

Population (2025-12-31)
  - Total: 477
  - Density: 70.8/km^{2} (183/sq mi)
- Time zone: UTC+01:00 (CET)
  - Summer (DST): UTC+02:00 (CEST)
- Postal codes: 56754
- Dialling codes: 02672
- Vehicle registration: COC
- Website: www.roes-eifel.de

Roes is an Ortsgemeinde – a municipality belonging to a Verbandsgemeinde, a kind of collective municipality – in the Cochem-Zell district in Rhineland-Palatinate, Germany. It belongs to the Verbandsgemeinde of Kaisersesch.

== Geography ==
The municipality lies in the part of the eastern Eifel known as the Vordereifel (“Fore-Eifel” or “Further Eifel”), between Treis-Karden and Autobahn A 48.

== Politics ==
=== Municipal council ===
The council is made up of 12 council members, who were elected by majority vote at the municipal election held on 7 June 2009, and the honorary mayor as chairman.

=== Mayor ===
Roes’s mayor is Jörg Fuhrmann, and his deputies are Johannes Schmitt and Michael Sesterhenn.

=== Coat of arms ===
The German blazon reads: Über blauem Schildfuß, darin ein silberner Schwan, gespalten durch einen mit einer silbernen Urne mit drei goldenen Ähren und Halmen belegten grünen Pfahl; vorne in Silber ein roter Sparrenschrägbalken; hinten in Silber drei rote heraldische Rosen, pfahlweise übereinander.

The municipality’s arms might in English heraldic language be described thus: Argent, between a bend dancetty and three roses in pale gules a pale vert charged with an urn of the first issuant from which three ears of wheat Or, on a base azure a swan sans legs of the first.

The swan refers to the Schwanenkirche (“Swan’s Church”), which was originally built between about 1460 and 1492. The “bend dancetty” (diagonal zigzag) is drawn from the arms once borne by the Lords of Pyrmont, who built the Schwanenkirche. In 1936, from a cremation grave from Urnfield times east of the Roes-Brohl road came the urn that stands as a charge on the pale. This stands for the long history of settlement in the area. The three ears of wheat stand for agriculture. The three roses are a canting charge, referring to the municipality’s name and its origin.

== Culture and sightseeing ==
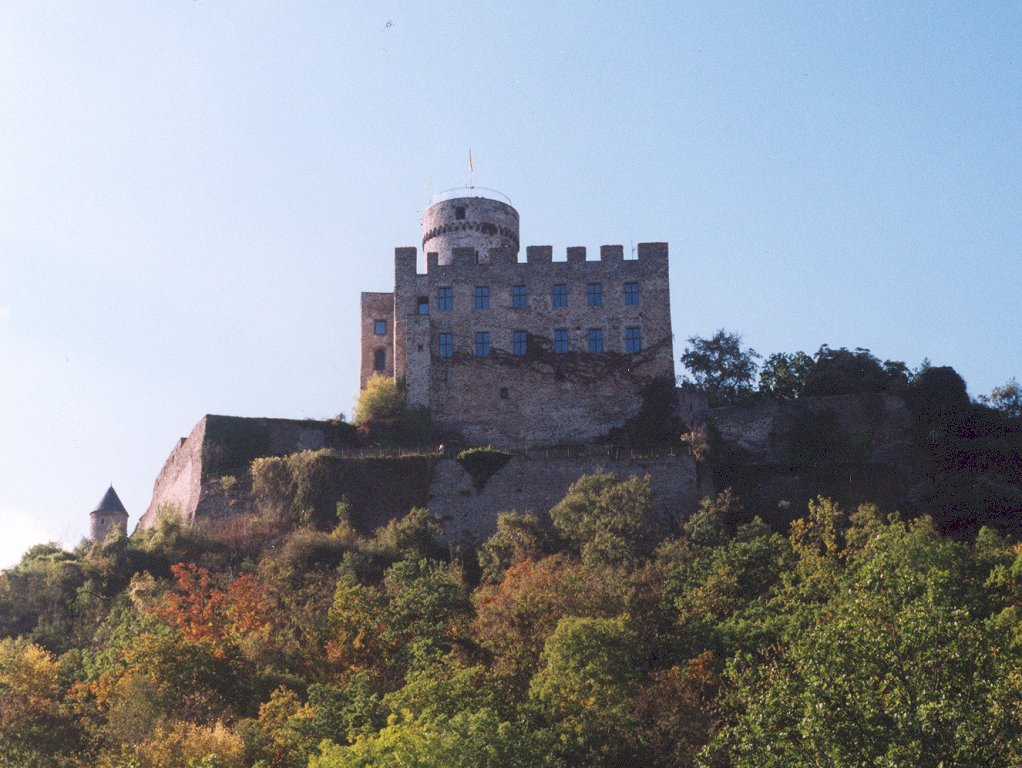
Pyrmont Castle, east side

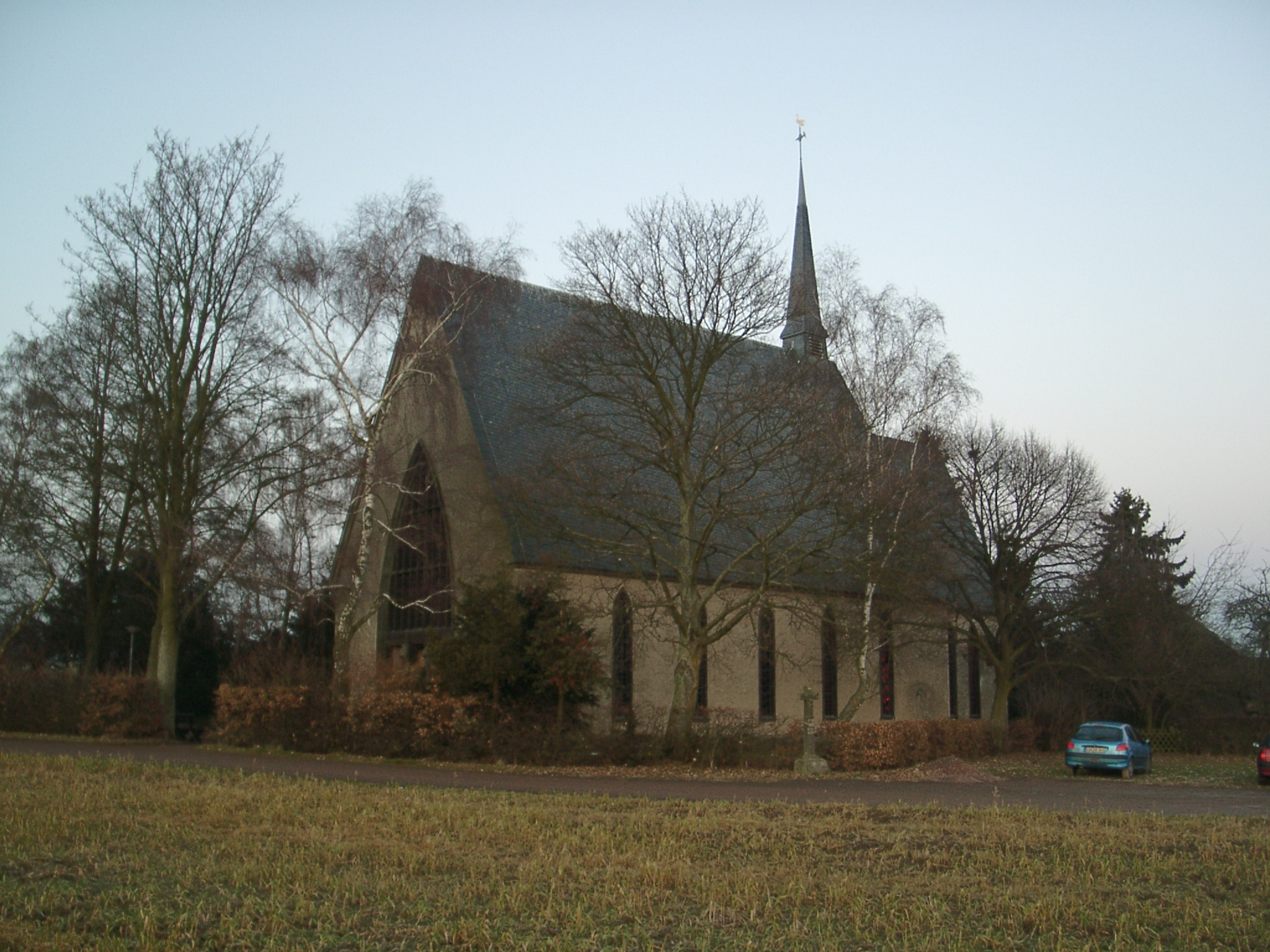
Schwanenkirche

=== Buildings ===
The following are listed buildings or sites in Rhineland-Palatinate’s Directory of Cultural Monuments:

- Saint Giles’s Catholic Church (branch church; Filialkirche St. Aegidius), Kirchstraße 2 – quarrystone aisleless church, 1861/1862
- Hauptstraße 38 – former Pyrmont tithe estate, solid house with half-hipped roof
- At the Schwanenkirche, graveyard – basalt wayside cross, marked 1697
- Bridge on Kreisstraße (District Road) 27, northeast of the Pyrmonter Mühle – with bridge chapel, 20th century, inside, a Baroque Trinity relief, wayside cross; sculpted basalt pillar
- Pyrmont Castle, southeast of the village (monumental zone) – mentioned in 1225, possibly built by Kuno von Schönberg, demolished beginning in 1810; inner castle and two outer baileys separated from it by moats, round keep, 13th century, to the north more remnants; chapel’s quire south of the castle preserved, 15th century; residence expansion begun in 1712, formerly a three-floor plastered building with hipped roof, beginning in 1963 rebuilding for residential purposes begun by the architect Hentrich, Düsseldorf, with, among other things, a flat roof, on the southwest side a lower castle with two round towers, beyond the water defence (not a full moat) a bailey with its own buildings
- Milestone on Kreisstraße 25, going towards Kaifenheim – obelisk, first third of the 19th century
- Pyrmonter Mühle (mill), south of Pyrmont Castle – timber-frame house, partly solid, half-hipped roof, 18th or 19th century
- Schwanenkirche (“Swan’s Church”), on Kreisstraße 25, south of the village – aisleless church, 1952, wayside cross, marked 1705
- Wayside cross on Kreisstraße 27 – basalt, marked 1603
- Wayside cross on Kreisstraße 25 going towards Forst
- Wayside cross on Kreisstraße 25 going towards Brachtendorf – basalt, 17th century
- Wayside cross at Kreisstraße 25 and the road to Kaifenheim – marked 1847
- Wayside cross, northeast of the village on the road to Mühlen – basalt, marked 1758

Also, although not a listed building, an old school building is also to be found in Roes.

=== Natural monuments ===
- Waterfall on the Elz at the Pyrmonter Mühle

=== Regular events ===
- Roeser Pfingsten (bachelors' festival)
- Kirchweih St. Ägidius-Kirmes (church consecration festival), first weekend in September
