= Gamlen =

- Municipality
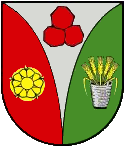
- Coat of arms

- Location of Gamlen within Cochem-Zell district
- Interactive map of Gamlen
- Location within Germany Location within Rhineland-Palatinate
- Coordinates: 50°14′23″N 7°12′4″E
- Country: Germany
- State: Rhineland-Palatinate
- District: Cochem-Zell
- Municipal assoc.: Kaisersesch

Government
  - Mayor (2019–24): Michael Münch

Area
  - Total: 5.59 km^{2} (2.16 sq mi)
- Elevation: 350 m (1,150 ft)

Population (2025-12-31)
  - Total: 545
  - Density: 97.5/km^{2} (253/sq mi)
- Time zone: UTC+01:00 (CET)
  - Summer (DST): UTC+02:00 (CEST)
- Postal codes: 56761
- Dialling codes: 02653
- Vehicle registration: COC
- Website: www.gamlen.de

Gamlen is an Ortsgemeinde – a municipality belonging to a Verbandsgemeinde, a kind of collective municipality – in the Cochem-Zell district in Rhineland-Palatinate, Germany. It belongs to the Verbandsgemeinde of Kaisersesch, whose seat is in the like-named town.

== Geography ==
The municipality lies in the Eifel about halfway between Eulgem to the west and Kaifenheim to the east.

== History ==
In 1252, Gamlen had its first documentary mention as Gammenheim in a donation document. In 1338, Emperor Ludwig the Bavarian granted Count Robert of Virneburg the right to appoint Schultheißen in Gaemyheim. The landholders in Gamlen in the 18th century were the Mayen Foundation, the Beilstein Monastery, the Barons of Gymnich, the Counts of Leyen and the Barons of Clodt. Beginning in 1794, Gamlen lay under French rule. In 1815 it was assigned to the Kingdom of Prussia at the Congress of Vienna. Since 1946, it has been part of the then newly founded state of Rhineland-Palatinate. Since 2004, Gamlen has had a new, big town hall.

== Politics ==
=== Municipal council ===
The council is made up of 12 council members, who were elected by majority vote at the municipal election held on 7 June 2009, and the honorary mayor as chairman.

=== Mayor ===
Gamlen's mayor is Michael Münch.

=== Coat of arms ===
The German blazon reads: Das Wappen wird durch eine gestürzte Spitze gespalten. Darin in Rot drei Steine. Vorne in Rot eine goldene Rose, hinten in Grün ein silberner Korb mit fünf goldenen Ähren.

The municipality's arms might in English heraldic language be described thus: Per pile embowed, gules a rose Or, argent three stones, one and two, of the first, and vert a basket of the third issuant from which five ears of wheat of the second.

The charge in chief, the three stones, refer to the church's patron saint, Stephen, who along with Saint Peter has been mentioned as patron saint since 1680. The rose recalls the nearby Rosenthal Monastery. A townsman from Gammenheim – the village's name at the time – donated his grain harvest to the monastery in 1278. The market rights granted the village very early on are symbolized by the basket, and the ears of wheat refer to the municipality's agricultural activities.

== Culture and sightseeing ==
=== Buildings ===
The following are listed buildings or sites in Rhineland-Palatinate’s Directory of Cultural Monuments:

- Saint Stephen’s Catholic Church (branch church; Filialkirche St. Stephan), Hauptstraße 31 – Gothic Revival aisleless church, 1878; outside, crucifix; warriors’ memorial with relief 1914–1918
- Hauptstraße 10 – former school; brick building, about 1900
- On Landesstraße (State Road) 109 – wayside cross, 18th or 19th century
- On Landesstraße 109 – wayside cross, from 1776
- northeast of Gamlen – wayside cross; pedestal and shaft, 18th century
