= Düngenheim =

- Municipality
- Coat of arms

- Location of Düngenheim within Cochem-Zell district
- Interactive map of Düngenheim
- Location within Germany Location within Rhineland-Palatinate
- Coordinates: 50°15′31″N 7°10′10″E
- Country: Germany
- State: Rhineland-Palatinate
- District: Cochem-Zell
- Municipal assoc.: Kaisersesch

Government
  - Mayor (2019–24): Mike Kaiser

Area
  - Total: 9.31 km^{2} (3.59 sq mi)
- Elevation: 430 m (1,410 ft)

Population (2025-12-31)
  - Total: 1,294
  - Density: 139/km^{2} (360/sq mi)
- Time zone: UTC+01:00 (CET)
  - Summer (DST): UTC+02:00 (CEST)
- Postal codes: 56761
- Dialling codes: 02653
- Vehicle registration: COC
- Website: www.duengenheim.de

Düngenheim is an Ortsgemeinde – a municipality belonging to a Verbandsgemeinde, a kind of collective municipality – in the Cochem-Zell district in Rhineland-Palatinate, Germany. It belongs to the Verbandsgemeinde of Kaisersesch, whose seat is in the like-named town.

== Geography ==
=== Location ===
Düngenheim lies in the Eifel at the edge of the district of Cochem-Zell. The municipality stretches to a length of 1.4 km and is the biggest municipality in the Verbandsgemeinde of Kaisersesch.

=== Climate ===
Yearly precipitation in Düngenheim amounts to 729 mm, which falls into the middle third of the precipitation chart for all Germany. At 47% of the German Weather Service’s weather stations, lower figures are recorded. The driest month is September. The most rainfall comes in November. In that month, precipitation is 1.4 times what it is in September. Precipitation varies only minimally and is spread quite evenly throughout the year. At only 1% of the weather stations are lower seasonal swings are recorded.

== History ==
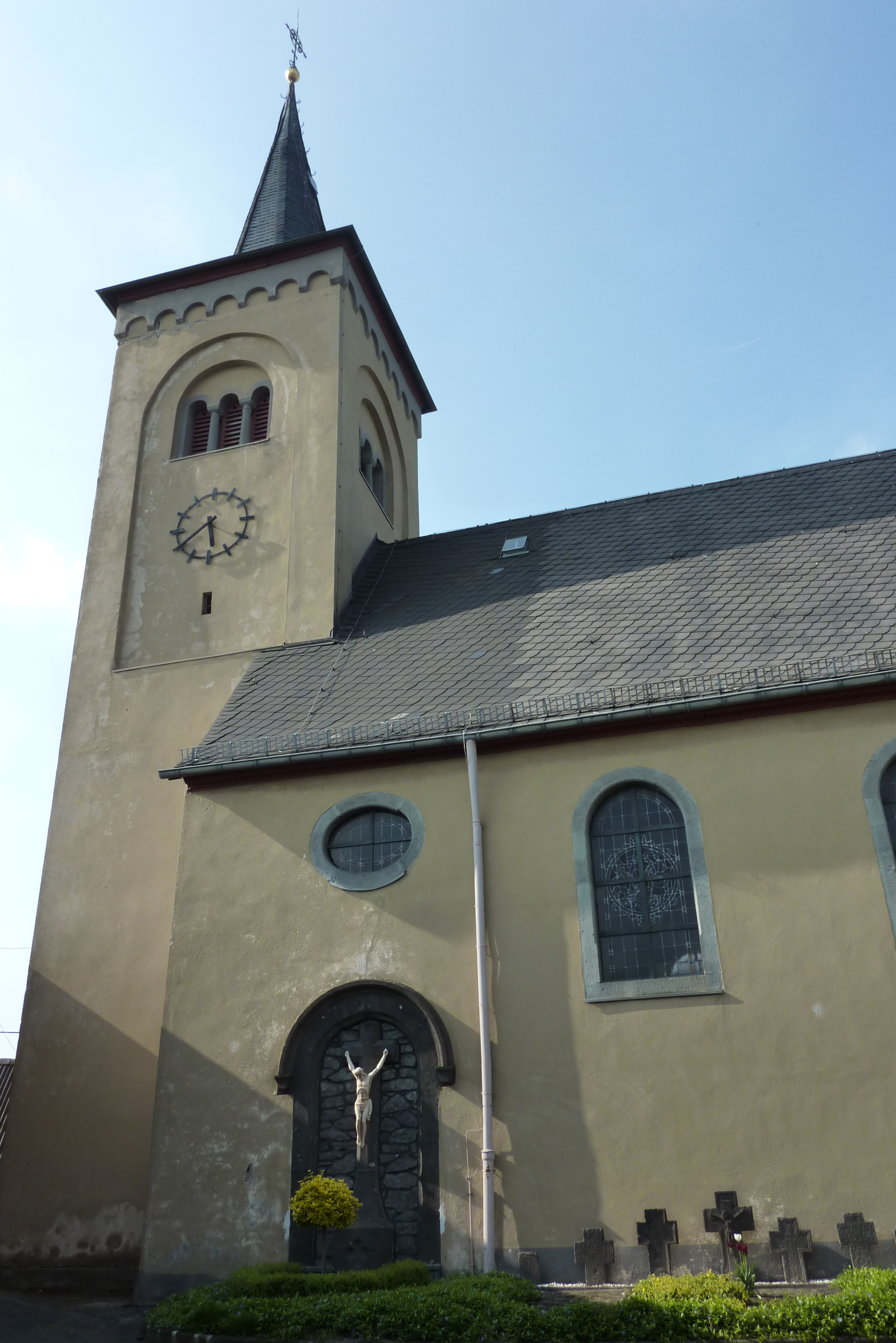
St. Simeon in Düngenheim

In 1997, the village marked 900 years of existence with a great historical market in the village centre. The village’s whole history was edited together in the book “Von Dunechinga bis Düngenheim” – a reference to differing names that it has had through the ages – by the local author Stefan Gorges, whose father had begun this chronicle.

Düngenheim was part of the Electorate of Trier and the local lordship was held by the Stuben Monastery. Beginning in 1794, Düngenheim lay under French rule. In 1815 it was assigned to the Kingdom of Prussia at the Congress of Vienna. Since 1946, it has been part of the then newly founded state of Rhineland-Palatinate.

Long a part of Düngenheim’s everyday life was slate quarrying in various pits throughout the area. In the mid 20th century, the operations were shut down. Quite a few men still suffer today from the effects of the hard outdoor work. The quarries’ entrances were sealed up and now serve only as lodgings for bats. Nevertheless, the village’s slate quarrying history can still be seen by visitors in the great expanses of slate rubble.

== Politics ==
=== Municipal council ===
The council is made up of 16 council members, who were elected by proportional representation at the municipal election held on 7 June 2009, and the honorary mayor as chairman. The 2004 municipal election had been conducted by majority vote.

The municipal election held on 7 June 2009 yielded the following results:

Year	FWG 1	FWG 2	Total
2009	7	9	16 seats

=== Mayor ===
Düngenheim’s mayor is Mike Kaiser.

== Culture and sightseeing ==
=== Buildings ===
The following are listed buildings or sites in Rhineland-Palatinate’s Directory of Cultural Monuments:

- Saint Simeon’s Catholic Church (Kirche St. Simeon), Kirchstraße – aisleless church, from 1738; Classicist west tower, 1846; quarrystone transept and quire, 1921-1922; outside: basalt and marble cross; 16 basalt cross fragments, from among other years 1594, 1619, 1635, 1631; Gothic Revival cross, from 1871; five grave tablets, 17th and 18th century; warriors’ memorial with Madonna statue
- Hauptstraße 6 – former school; quarrystone building, 1830-1840, architect possibly J. C. von Lassaulx
- Hauptstraße 30 – wayside cross from 1763
- Kirchstraße – wayside cross
- Kirchstraße – relief, 18th century, wayside cross
- Kirchstraße – Nische, 19th century, with Crucifixion group, 18th century
- Monrealer Straße – Pietà, in the wayside chapel, 18th century
- Töpferstraße 15 – wayside cross; Nischenkreuz, Basalt, from 1624
- Urmersbacher Straße – sandstone wayside cross, from 1725
- Urmersbacher Straße – basalt wayside cross, from 1694
- Urmersbacher Straße – wayside cross, from 1686
- Urmersbacher Straße/corner of Hauptstraße – boundary stones, from among other years 1613
- On the way into the village – boundary stone; obelisk-shaped, earlier half of 19th century
- On Kreisstraße 13 going towards Düngenheim – wayside cross; sandstone niche cross
- On Landesstraße 98 – wayside cross
- East of Düngenheim – wayside cross; niche cross, from 1639
- southeast of Düngenheim – basalt wayside cross, 18th century

=== Clubs ===
The municipality has a developed club life with many different clubs and associations: an angling club, the Düngenheimer Carnevals Club (DCC), the Möhnenverein (“women fools”, also Carnival/Shrovetide-related), TuS Düngenheim (gymnastics and sport), the Tambourverein (drum corps), the Düngenheim Volunteer Fire Brigade, a church choir, the Schürzenjägerfans (“Skirt Chaser Fans”), the Eifel Club, the German Shepherd Club and the Junggesellenverein Düngenheim (bachelors’ club).

The biggest club in the municipality is the gymnastics and sport club. The many departments make for a complex club structure. The branch with the broadest range of offerings is the football department. At the moment, SG Düngenheim/Urmersbach/Masburg is playing with its first team in District League (Kreisliga) B, and also with its second team in District League C. Youngsters from 6 to 17 can play on the various youth teams. Besides the football department, there has been since 2008 a Völkerball team, which stands as the only such club in the Eifel-Moselle-Hunsrück Völkerball region. The greatest triumph has been, besides the 2009 German Championship, the attendant qualification for the international Völkerball Club Championships, which are held as a parallel event to the Winter Olympics every four years.

== Economy and infrastructure ==
=== Home for people with disabilities ===
Located in Düngenheim is the Bildungs- und Pflegeheim Sankt Martin, an educational and care facility for people with disabilities. Nurses and educators tend to the residents. Those with mild disabilities can live independently in supervised living groups and work at jobs in workshops for the disabled. The Kinderheim St. Martin (“Saint Martin’s Children’s Home”) is one of the biggest employers in the Verbandsgemeinde of Kaisersesch. It lies on the edge of the Wettau Woodland.

=== Kindergartens and school ===
The primary school’s sponsor is the St. Hildegardishaus GmbH.

In 2004, the sponsor was granted approval to institute a primary school, thus giving the municipality of Düngenheim its first primary school since 1977.

The school, Grundschule St. Martin Düngenheim, is a two-stream denominational school which currently has six classes. It offers integrative schooling for children with and without special needs.
