= Hauroth =

- Municipality
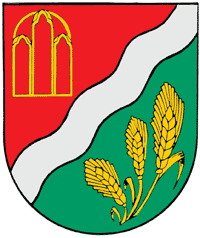
- Coat of arms

- Location of Hauroth within Cochem-Zell district
- Interactive map of Hauroth
- Location within Germany Location within Rhineland-Palatinate
- Coordinates: 50°15′04″N 7°06′08″E
- Country: Germany
- State: Rhineland-Palatinate
- District: Cochem-Zell
- Municipal assoc.: Kaisersesch

Government
  - Mayor (2019–24): Stefan Schneider

Area
  - Total: 3.94 km^{2} (1.52 sq mi)
- Elevation: 520 m (1,710 ft)

Population (2025-12-31)
  - Total: 339
  - Density: 86.0/km^{2} (223/sq mi)
- Time zone: UTC+01:00 (CET)
  - Summer (DST): UTC+02:00 (CEST)
- Postal codes: 56761
- Dialling codes: 02653
- Vehicle registration: COC
- Website: www.hauroth.de

Hauroth is an Ortsgemeinde – a municipality belonging to a Verbandsgemeinde, a kind of collective municipality – in the Cochem-Zell district in Rhineland-Palatinate, Germany. It belongs to the Verbandsgemeinde of Kaisersesch, whose seat is in the like-named town.

== Geography ==
The municipality lies in the Eifel.

== History ==
In 1103, Hauroth had its first documentary mention in a falsified document as Husenrode. Beginning in 1794, Hauroth lay under French rule. In 1815 it was assigned to the Kingdom of Prussia at the Congress of Vienna. Since 1946, it has been part of the then newly founded state of Rhineland-Palatinate.

== Politics ==
=== Municipal council ===
The council is made up of 8 council members, who were elected by majority vote at the municipal election held on 7 June 2009, and the honorary mayor as chairman.

=== Mayor ===
Hauroth’s mayor is Stefan Schneider.

=== Coat of arms ===
The German blazon reads: Durch einen schräglinken silbernen Wellenbalken von Rot und Grün geteilt. Oben ein durchbrochenes rundbogiges, durch drei gestaffelte, nasenbesetzte Spitzbögen unterteiltes goldenes Fenster. Unten drei goldene Ähren.

The municipality’s arms might in English heraldic language be described thus: A bend sinister wavy argent between gules a window with three staggered lancet arches joined by a semicircular arch Or, and vert three ears of wheat of the third.

The bend sinister wavy refers to the place where the village began, on the Kimpelbach. The charge below this, the three ears of wheat, refers to the village’s founding in the 11th century as an agricultural estate (whose name meant “Huso’s Clearing”). The other charge, a Gothic church window modelled on one in the cloister at Ravengiersburg Monastery refers to a document from this monastery, which says that the Provost of Ravengiersburg transferred, among other things, holdings in Hauroth to Saint Stephen’s Foundation in Mainz in 1103.

The arms have been borne since 16 January 1991.

== Culture and sightseeing ==
The following are listed buildings or sites in Rhineland-Palatinate’s Directory of Cultural Monuments:

- Saint Bartholomew’s Chapel (Kapelle St. Bartholomäus) – aisleless church, 1950-1951
- Northwest of Hauroth – chapel; inside relief of the Trinity, 18th century; before it a grave cross, 18th century
