= Masburg =

- Municipality
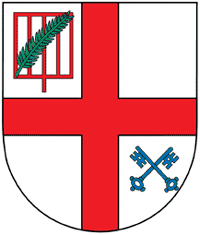
- Coat of arms

- Location of Masburg within Cochem-Zell district
- Interactive map of Masburg
- Location within Germany Location within Rhineland-Palatinate
- Coordinates: 50°14′29″N 7°7′0″E
- Country: Germany
- State: Rhineland-Palatinate
- District: Cochem-Zell
- Municipal assoc.: Kaisersesch
- Subdivisions: 3

Government
  - Mayor (2019–24): Patrick Schopp

Area
  - Total: 9.13 km^{2} (3.53 sq mi)
- Elevation: 490 m (1,610 ft)

Population (2025-12-31)
  - Total: 1,095
  - Density: 120/km^{2} (311/sq mi)
- Time zone: UTC+01:00 (CET)
  - Summer (DST): UTC+02:00 (CEST)
- Postal codes: 56761
- Dialling codes: 02653
- Vehicle registration: COC
- Website: www.masburg.de

Masburg is an Ortsgemeinde – a municipality belonging to a Verbandsgemeinde, a kind of collective municipality – in the Cochem-Zell district in Rhineland-Palatinate, Germany. It belongs to the Verbandsgemeinde of Kaisersesch, whose seat is in the like-named town.

== Geography ==
=== Location ===
The municipality lies in the Eifel, roughly 2 km northwest of Kaisersesch. Masburg has a total area of 9.13 km^{2}, 3.06 km^{2} of which is wooded.

=== Constituent communities ===
Masburg's Ortsteile are Masburg (main centre), Breitenbruch, Präfekturhof and Schöne Aussicht.

== History ==
About 1050, Masburg, long an Electoral-Trier holding, had its first documentary mention. Beginning in 1794, Masburg lay under French rule. In 1815 it was assigned to the Kingdom of Prussia at the Congress of Vienna. Since 1946, it has been part of the then newly founded state of Rhineland-Palatinate.

== Politics ==
=== Municipal council ===
The council is made up of 16 council members, who were elected by proportional representation at the municipal election held on 7 June 2009, and the honorary mayor as chairman. The 16 seats are shared among five voters’ groups.

=== Mayor ===
Masburg's mayor is Patrick Schopp.

=== Coat of arms ===
The municipality's arms might be described thus: Argent a cross gules, in dexter chief a gridiron of the same surmounted by a palm leaf bendwise sinister vert, and in sinister base two keys in saltire, the wards to chief and turned outwards, azure.

== Culture and sightseeing ==
=== Buildings ===
The following are listed buildings or sites in Rhineland-Palatinate’s Directory of Cultural Monuments:

- Saint Lawrence’s Catholic Parish Church (Pfarrkirche St. Laurentius), Pfarrstraße 31 – three-naved pseudo-basilica, 1899/1900, architects Henderichs and Lambert von Fisenne, Gelsenkirchen; outside: three basalt tomb slabs, 1695, 1751, 1777; whole complex with surrounding area
- Hauptstraße – water cistern, cube, marked 1921
- Hauptstraße – warriors’ memorial; whole complex with sculpture-topped pylon, 1920s

As well as the listed buildings above, there is also a memorial belltower to the family Miesen who lived here between 1773 and 1819, and were known for pouring bells.
