= Kalenborn, Cochem-Zell =

Kalenborn
- Municipality
- Location of Kalenborn within Cochem-Zell district
- Interactive map of Kalenborn
- Location within Germany Location within Rhineland-Palatinate
- Coordinates: 50°15′41″N 7°4′48″E
- Country: Germany
- State: Rhineland-Palatinate
- District: Cochem-Zell
- Municipal assoc.: Kaisersesch

Government
  - Mayor (2019–24): Werner Arenz

Area
  - Total: 5.3 km^{2} (2.0 sq mi)
- Elevation: 430 m (1,410 ft)

Population (2025-12-31)
  - Total: 242
  - Density: 46/km^{2} (120/sq mi)
- Time zone: UTC+01:00 (CET)
  - Summer (DST): UTC+02:00 (CEST)
- Postal codes: 56759
- Dialling codes: 02653
- Vehicle registration: COC

Kalenborn (German pronunciation: [ˈkaːlənbɔʁn]) is an Ortsgemeinde – a municipality belonging to a Verbandsgemeinde, a kind of collective municipality – in the Cochem-Zell district in Rhineland-Palatinate, Germany. It belongs to the Verbandsgemeinde of Kaisersesch, whose seat is in the like-named town.

== Geography ==
The municipality lies in the Eifel about 4 km northwest of Kaisersesch.

== History ==
Beginning in 1794, Kalenborn lay under French rule. In 1815 it was assigned to the Kingdom of Prussia at the Congress of Vienna. Since 1946, it has been part of the then newly founded state of Rhineland-Palatinate.

== Politics ==
=== Municipal council ===
The council is made up of 6 council members, who were elected by majority vote at the municipal election held on 7 June 2009, and the honorary mayor as chairman.

=== Mayor ===
Kalenborn's mayor is Werner Arenz, and his deputies are Toni Thelen and Erwin Groß.

=== Coat of arms ===
The municipality's arms might be described thus: Tierced in mantle, dexter vert three ears of wheat, one palewise surmounted by another bendwise sinister, itself surmounted by another palewise to dexter of the first, all Or, sinister gules a well pump argent, and in base Or a tower masoned sable with a conical roof of the third.

== Culture and sightseeing ==
The following are listed buildings or sites in Rhineland-Palatinate’s Directory of Cultural Monuments:

- Hauptstraße – old school; with teacher's dwelling, from 1909
- northeast of Kalenborn, before a chapel – basalt milestone, second fourth of the 19th century
