= Eulgem =

- Municipality
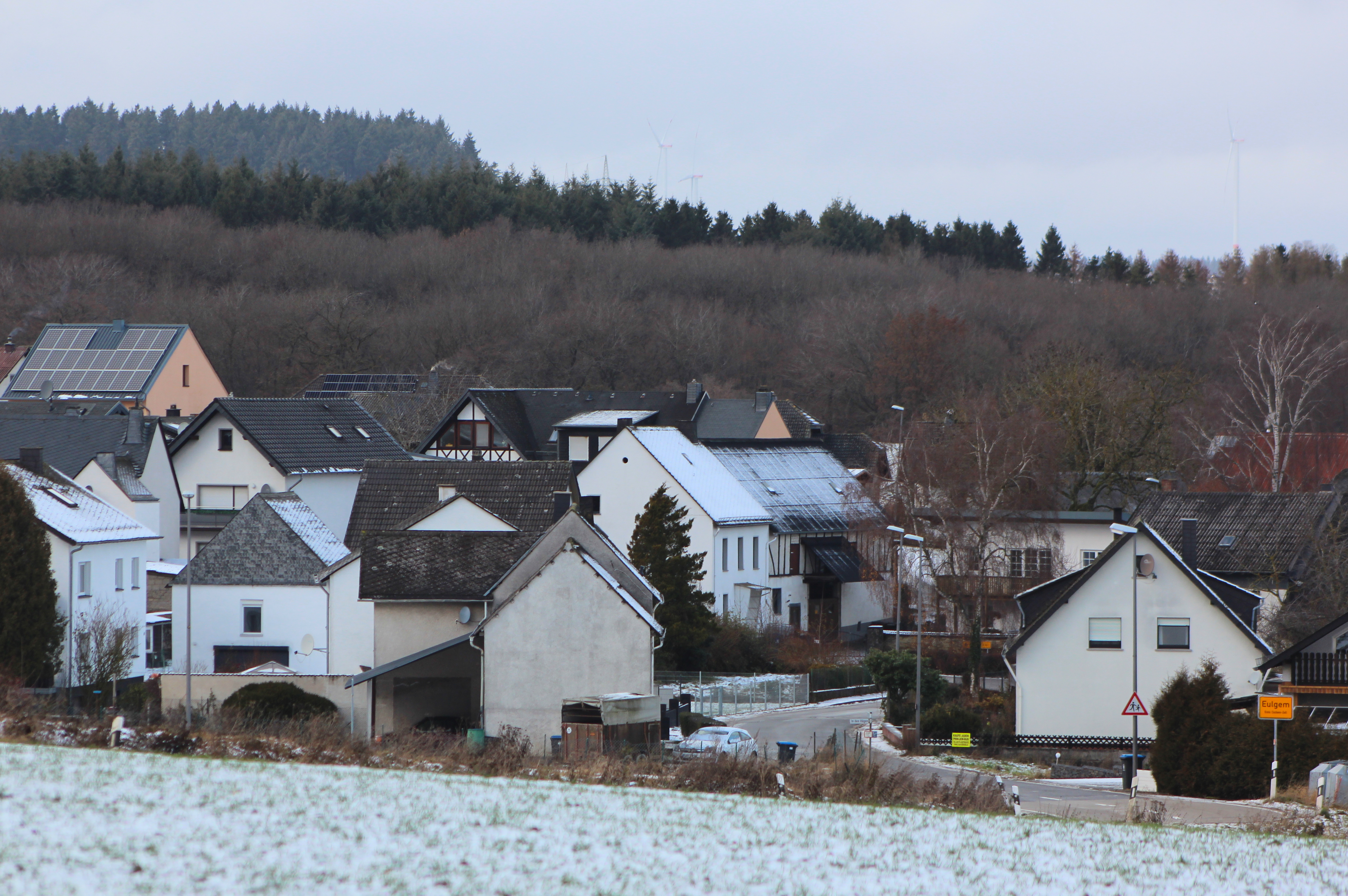

- Location of Eulgem within Cochem-Zell district
- Interactive map of Eulgem
- Location within Germany Location within Rhineland-Palatinate
- Coordinates: 50°14′24″N 7°10′33″E
- Country: Germany
- State: Rhineland-Palatinate
- District: Cochem-Zell
- Municipal assoc.: Kaisersesch

Government
  - Mayor (2019–24): Martina Geers

Area
  - Total: 3.01 km^{2} (1.16 sq mi)
- Elevation: 415–440 m (1,362–1,444 ft)

Population (2025-12-31)
  - Total: 180
  - Density: 60/km^{2} (150/sq mi)
- Time zone: UTC+01:00 (CET)
  - Summer (DST): UTC+02:00 (CEST)
- Postal codes: 56761
- Dialling codes: 02653
- Vehicle registration: COC
- Website: www.eulgem.de

Eulgem is an Ortsgemeinde – a municipality belonging to a Verbandsgemeinde, a kind of collective municipality – in the Cochem-Zell district in Rhineland-Palatinate, Germany. It belongs to the Verbandsgemeinde of Kaisersesch, whose seat is in the like-named town.

== Geography ==
The municipality lies in the Eifel roughly 2 km northeast of Kaisersesch.

== Name ==
The village’s name has taken various forms over the ages. About 1100, it was Hylichenheim, in 1278 Holichenheim, in 1427 Ulchenheym, in 1592 Ulchem, in 1656/1657 Eulchem and in 1789 Eultgem. Clearly, the placename is one of many that end in —heim, or at least it originally was. This placename ending is very typical of places founded in Frankish times. Over time, the —heim ending has been corrupted to —em.

Werner Schumacher offers several possible derivations for the distinguishing prefix, but none is certain. It could be from the Latin for elm, or perhaps from Olk or Ulca, meaning “land that can be worked by plough” or “land that is worked”. Schumacher also cites a Dr. Beestermöller who believes that the root may be a Celtic reference to wetlands.

== History ==
Somewhat outside the village as it stands today, near the brook, there was supposedly a find that might have been of some importance, some stone remains that might have pointed to very early settlers in the area. As far as is known, however, these were never investigated. They might have been from an early settlement, farm or oil mill established before the Franks took over the land, but nothing is certain.

In 1100, Eulgem had its first documentary mention under the name Hylichenheim. Beginning in 1794, Eulgem lay under French rule. In 1815 it was assigned to the Kingdom of Prussia at the Congress of Vienna. Since 1946, it has been part of the then newly founded state of Rhineland-Palatinate.

== Politics ==
=== Municipal council ===
The council is made up of 6 council members, who were elected by majority vote at the municipal election held on 7 June 2009, and the honorary mayor as chairwoman.

=== Mayor ===
Eulgem’s mayor is Martina Geers.

=== Coat of arms ===
The German blazon reads: Das Wappen geteilt von Silber und Grün. Oben schräggekreuzt eine schwarze Speerspitze und ein blauer Lilienstab, in der Mitte gedeckt mit einer roten Rose. Unten eine silberne Urne, umrahmt von silbernen Steinen eines Hügelgrabes in der Vorderansicht.

The municipality’s arms might in English heraldic language be described thus: Per fess argent a spearhead sable and a staff ensigned with a fleur-de-lis azure per saltire, the whole surmounted by a rose abased gules, and vert an urn with two handles within, issuant from base, the stones of a barrow, all of the first.

The spearhead is an actual artefact found in a barrow from La Tène times in 1906. The lily staff is Saint Anne’s attribute, thus representing the figure who has been the parish’s patron saint for centuries. In 1278, the nearby Rosenthal Cistercian Convent, whose armorial bearing was the rose, thus explaining the charge surmounting the other two, was drawing income from the farms in the municipality. The barrow and the urn stand for the local prehistory and early history – there are 28 La Tène barrows in the cadastral area known as “Beulhöchst”, and a further Roman one in the municipal forest.

The arms have been borne since 4 February 1994.

== Culture and sightseeing ==
=== Buildings ===
The following are listed buildings or sites in Rhineland-Palatinate’s Directory of Cultural Monuments:

- Saint Anne’s Catholic Church (branch church; Filialkirche St. Anna), Hauptstraße 15 – brick aisleless church, 1900/1901, architect Lambert von Fisenne, Gelsenkirchen
- Fountain; basalt, from 1858
- Düngenheimerstraße/corner of Hambucher Straße – chapel, Pietà; missionary cross, from 1760
- Sängerweg/corner of Hauptstraße – wayside cross, fragment, 1624
- On Kreisstraße (District Road) 21, going towards Hambuch – Heiligenhäuschen (a small, shrinelike structure consecrated to a saint or saints), partly timber-frame; cross, from 1830
- North of Eulgem – wayside cross, from 1727
- North of Eulgem – wayside cross, 18th century
