= Brieden =

- Municipality
- Coat of arms

- Location of Brieden within Cochem-Zell district
- Interactive map of Brieden
- Location within Germany Location within Rhineland-Palatinate
- Coordinates: 50°11′22″N 7°15′53″E
- Country: Germany
- State: Rhineland-Palatinate
- District: Cochem-Zell
- Municipal assoc.: Kaisersesch

Government
  - Mayor (2019–24): Erwin Thönnes

Area
  - Total: 4.40 km^{2} (1.70 sq mi)
- Elevation: 277 m (909 ft)

Population (2025-12-31)
  - Total: 151
  - Density: 34.3/km^{2} (88.9/sq mi)
- Time zone: UTC+01:00 (CET)
  - Summer (DST): UTC+02:00 (CEST)
- Postal codes: 56829
- Dialling codes: 02672
- Vehicle registration: COC
- Website: www.brieden-eifel.de

Brieden is an Ortsgemeinde – a municipality belonging to a Verbandsgemeinde, a kind of collective municipality – in the Cochem-Zell district in Rhineland-Palatinate, Germany. It belongs to the Verbandsgemeinde of Kaisersesch.

== Geography ==
The municipality lies near the edge of the Eifel, just north of the river Moselle.

== History ==
In 1231, Brieden had its first documentary mention, and at this time it was subject to Electoral-Trier overlordship. Between 1698 and 1701, the local chapel, consecrated to Saint Joseph, was built by the Abbot of Himmerod, Robert Bootz. It belonged as a branch church to the parish of Pommern. Beginning in 1794, Brieden lay under French rule. In 1814 it was assigned to the Kingdom of Prussia at the Congress of Vienna. Since 1946, it has been part of the then newly founded state of Rhineland-Palatinate.

== Politics ==
=== Municipal council ===
The council is made up of 12 council members, who were elected by majority vote at the municipal election held on 7 June 2009, and the honorary mayor as chairman.

=== Mayor ===
Brieden's mayor is Erwin Thönnes.

=== Coat of arms ===
The German blazon reads: Schräggeviert von Silber und Grün. Im ersten Feld eine schwarze Säge, im zweiten Feld pfahlweise zwei goldene Rosen, in Feld 3 pfahlweise zwei ineinandergeschlungene silberne Ringe und in Feld 4 eine grüne Urne.

The municipality's arms might in English heraldic language be described thus: Per saltire in chief argent a saw fesswise sable, dexter vert two roses in pale Or, sinister two annulets in pale, the upper surmounting the lower, of the first, and in base argent an urn of the third.

The saw is Saint Joseph’s attribute, thus representing the municipality's and the church's patron saint since the time when the branch chapel was built in 1698. The roses are meant to refer to the Rosenthal Convent, which once had a great deal of holdings in the village. Himmerod Abbey, too, quite early on held an estate in Brieden, and drew tithes, thus explaining the charge consisting of two rings, drawn from the Abbey's arms. The urn is an actual artefact from the 8th or 9th century that was unearthed in 1959 in the traditional cadastral area known as Steinreich.

The arms have been borne since 1994.

== Culture and sightseeing ==
=== Buildings ===
The following are listed buildings or sites in Rhineland-Palatinate’s Directory of Cultural Monuments:

- Saint Joseph’s Catholic Church (Kirche St. Joseph), Hauptstraße 4 – Baroque aisleless church, 1698; stained glass, 1699.
- Hauptstraße 24 – basalt sculpture, 18th century.
- Hauptstraße 27 – estate complex; house from 1849, essentially possibly older (16th century?), year 1704 borne on the back, timber-frame commercial building, late 19th century; whole complex.
- Hauptstraße 40 – timber-frame building house, partly solid, late 19th century; whole complex with garden.
- Hauptstraße/Kirchstraße – basalt wayside cross from 1723.
- On the village's outskirts on Kreisstraße 30 going towards Pommern – wayside chapel, plastered building.
- On Kreisstraße 30 going towards Pommern – basalt wayside cross from 1730.
