= Kaifenheim =

- Municipality
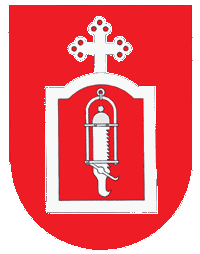
- Coat of arms

- Location of Kaifenheim within Cochem-Zell district
- Interactive map of Kaifenheim
- Location within Germany Location within Rhineland-Palatinate
- Coordinates: 50°14′44″N 7°13′36″E
- Country: Germany
- State: Rhineland-Palatinate
- District: Cochem-Zell
- Municipal assoc.: Kaisersesch

Government
  - Mayor (2019–24): Gerhard Mieden

Area
  - Total: 6.17 km^{2} (2.38 sq mi)
- Elevation: 350 m (1,150 ft)

Population (2025-12-31)
  - Total: 786
  - Density: 127/km^{2} (330/sq mi)
- Time zone: UTC+01:00 (CET)
  - Summer (DST): UTC+02:00 (CEST)
- Postal codes: 56761
- Dialling codes: 02653
- Vehicle registration: COC
- Website: www.kaifenheim.de

Kaifenheim is an Ortsgemeinde – a municipality belonging to a Verbandsgemeinde, a kind of collective municipality – in the Cochem-Zell district in Rhineland-Palatinate, Germany. It belongs to the Verbandsgemeinde of Kaisersesch, whose seat is in the like-named town.

== Geography ==
Kaifenheim lies in the Vordereifel (“Further Eifel”), more or less halfway between Mayen and Cochem in the northern part of the district. The Autobahn A 48 runs nearby, affording a quick link to Kaisersesch, Mayen and Koblenz. The municipality's population is 853.

The countryside here is characterized by fields and meadows mostly used for agriculture. There are streams, both big and small, the biggest of which is the Elzbach. This is spanned near Kaifenheim by an Autobahn bridge that is more than 100 m high.

== History ==
In 1005, Kaifenheim had its first documentary mention. The document reads: “1005 Aug 13 King Henry II donated to the Adalbert Foundation in Aachen, among other things, KIVENHEIM in the Gau of Meinvelt of the County of Bechelius.” More than three centuries later, in 1334, Kaifenheim became a parish seat.

As can be seen in the first documentary mention, the village's name has not always had its current form. Over the centuries, history has recorded the following forms: CAUPONIACUM, Kievenheim (in the Middle Ages), Kavenheim, Kevenheim, Kewenheim, Keyfenheim, Keiffenheim.

The last variant – with two Fs – is also a surname found in the Mayen area.

A 1745 Visitation report from the Rural Chapter of Ochtendung, Archdeaconry of Carden, states: Keyfenheim, Item nullum cathedratium; 3 ½ schilling Koltsche secundum antigum registrum Item communitas in ultima sinode novem summeren avence, et campanator unum pullum et summerum avence et manipulum luminis, et inde habet expensas. Item casta una in Aclesia 3 hall. Item officium 1 1/1 hall, or “Keyfenheim, no cathedraticum, the municipality must give 9 Simmer of oats for the horses; 1 Simmer of oats, 1 chicken and one bundle of candles are to be given by the sexton; craftsmen pay 1½ Heller.” According to documents kept at the Archdeaconry, Kaifenheim received visitations in 1563, 1569, 1620, 1728, 1778 and 1832.

On 26 October 1755, strong earthquakes were reported to have shaken the Eifel-Moselle region. There was heavy damage in some places: trees were uprooted and walls fell down. Further earthquakes were reported until 1759.

In 1780, the rectory was built.

About 1790, Kaifenheim was stricken with another disaster when the local livestock came down with anthrax. Among the human population, meanwhile, there was cholera. All livestock was driven out of the village to a meadow, nowadays known as Altenstall, while the people, who had stopped burying their dead because it led to the spread of the illness, turned to Saint Wendelin for help in their time of need. They promised him that, if he could help them, they would build a chapel in his honour. Wendelin apparently helped, but the people reneged on their promise and built no chapel, whereupon Kaifenheim was stricken with an even worse livestock disease, which all but killed off all the village's cattle. The people once more turned to Saint Wendelin, and repeated their promise of a chapel. Wendelin helped once more, and in 1798, a chapel consecrated to him was built. The toll taken by the later epidemic was considered rather light at the time – only six children died.

Beginning in 1794, Kaifenheim lay under French rule. In 1815 it was assigned to the Kingdom of Prussia at the Congress of Vienna.

It was also in 1815, on the night of 17 February, that Father Jakob Weber was beset by a band of marauding robbers at the rectory who smothered him with a pillow. His housekeeper and maid were “earwitnesses” to this grisly event. Out of fear of the robbers, they did not call for help until morning. By that time, the robbers had long fled and were far away with the clergyman's money. What was left of Father Weber's estate, to a total of 216 Thaler, was bequeathed to the local schoolchildren.

By 1825, the church had fallen into such disrepair that celebration of the Eucharist had to be transferred to the nearby Schwanenkirche (“Swan Church”), and in 1839, the police closed the old church for safety's sake, for fear that it would collapse.

In November 1828 several families, (one being of the Irmiter clan), and mainly the family with the surname Werner, emigrated to Brazil and to the USA on board the "Marques De Viana" along with others and were part of the first German migration to Brazil along those who were on board the "Luiza".

On 14 April 1841 (Easter Tuesday), the foundation stone was laid for the building of the parish church that still stands today. Tragically, during construction, on 30 May 1841, at about 11 o’clock in the morning, four building workers on the project were killed in an accident when a scaffold collapsed, sending five men to the ground 50 Fuß (local feet – about 17 m) below. There was only one survivor.

In April 1843, 13 families from Kaifenheim and Brachtendorf emigrated to the United States. Three more families followed them on 11 June 1844.

On 3 August 1844, Father Nalbach celebrated Mass for the first time in the new church, whose building costs had amounted to somewhere between 12,000 and 13,000 Thaler. Despite the church's own relative youth, one of the bells hanging there is quite old, dating from 1450.

It was then the old school's turn to be shut down by the police, but a new schoolhouse was built by 1846 for 3,000 Thaler.

In 1863 and 1864, a bridge was built over the Elz to improve the road link with Mayen. This cost 1,700 Thaler.

On 6 June 1865 (Whit Monday) at 10 o’clock in the evening, almost a fourth of the village burnt down in a devastating fire that saw 17 houses and 18 barns destroyed. Most of the younger villagers were away at a dancing event in Brachtendorf when the fire struck, leaving those in the village with rather little immediate help. Brachtendorf itself later lost 18 houses in a fire on 1 August 1872.

Modern communications came to Kaifenheim on 1 September 1901 when a telephone post opened in the village. A new financial institution, the Raiffeisenbank, was founded on 25 May 1902. In 1907, at Mayor Surges's behest, a standing fire brigade was established.

In 1912, Josef Fuhrmann, who had emigrated to Iowa with his family in 1868, came back to visit friends and kin in Kaifenheim and Gamlen. He had the great fortune to have the plans for his return trip to the United States ruined. Owing to the great demand, he could not get a ticket for the ship on which he had wanted to sail – the Titanic.

This was also lucky for Kaifenheim, for years after Josef Fuhrmann's return to Iowa, he helped greatly with the installation of a new High Altar at the local church. The cost for this was 40,000 Marks, fully half of which came from Mr. Fuhrmann, allowing the altar's cost to be covered in cash. The other half of the cost was covered by others’ donations.

In the spring of 1923, electric lighting came to Kaifenheim. Other infrastructure improvements included upgrades to all village streets in 1926 and the beginning of a postal bus service to Kaifenheim in 1930. Even during the Second World War, the trend continued, with a watermain being installed in 1940.

The war also brought disaster for one RAF bomber at Kaifenheim, but spared everyone on the ground. It crashed on 26 September 1944, killing all seven aboard. According to eyewitnesses, the burning aircraft circled over Kaifenheim, losing an engine, which fell down into a garden on Bachstraße after bouncing off a roof. Had it broken through the roof, it might well have killed the woman who was sleeping in the house at the time. A gunner came down, too, complete with his machine gun and turret, falling onto Hauptstraße (the village's main street). The bomber then crashed in a meadow near the outlying centre of Besch, bursting into flames easily owing to the load of white phosphorus incendiary bombs that it had been carrying. Nobody on the ground was injured, and even buildings were spared any significant damage. The recently gathered harvest was left unscathed. As a memorial, and to give thanks for deliverance from what might have been a much worse disaster, a Heiligenhäuschen (a small, shrinelike structure consecrated to a saint or saints) with a Madonna was built.

Since 1946, Kaifenheim has been part of the then newly founded state of Rhineland-Palatinate. In that same year, a volunteer fire brigade was established.

In 1952, the local drum corps, Wanderlust, for the first time produced Passion plays. The proceeds went to help with the fund for the restoration of the Schwanenkirche (“Swan Church”) in Roes, which had been destroyed in 1944 in an air raid.

On 11 July 1952, a fire claimed two barns. In November of the same year, the first passenger car made its appearance in Kaifenheim. By 1954, there were seven in the village.

A new school was dedicated on 17 October 1964. That year also saw work begin on the Autobahn bridge over the Elz valley. Its height above the valley floor would reach 108 m and its length 384 m. It was finished in September 1966. This was followed in 1968 by the opening of Autobahn A 48, which crosses the bridge.

In 1984, the parish of Kaifenheim marked its 650th anniversary. In 2001, the village was expanded with three new streets: Bergstraße, Neustraße and Ringstraße.

From 10 to 12 June 2005, Kaifenheim celebrated one thousand years of existence. One of the highlights was an appearance by Bläck Fööss.

== Politics ==
=== Municipal council ===
The council is made up of 12 council members, who were elected by majority vote at the municipal election held on 7 June 2009, and the honorary mayor as chairman.

=== Mayor ===
Kaifenheim's mayor is Reinhard Schmitt, and his deputies are Bettina Kaiser and Renate Johann.

== Culture and sightseeing ==
=== Regular events ===
- Waschhäuschenfest: The “Little Washing House Festival” is held on the second weekend in August at the village fountain on Kapellenstraße. It is organized and staged by local clubs.
- Kirmes: The traditional kermis is held on the second weekend in September at the municipal hall. It is organized and staged by local clubs.
- Theatre: The Kaifenheim Theatre Club puts on a comedy on several weekends in November. This is performed in local dialect.

=== Buildings ===
The following are listed buildings or sites in Rhineland-Palatinate’s Directory of Cultural Monuments:

- Saint Nicholas’s Catholic Parish Church (Pfarrkirche St. Nikolaus), Kirchweg 5 – three-naved hall church, 1841–1842, building inspector Ferdinand Nebel
- Hauptstraße 17 – rectory, building with hipped roof, 1778; in the garden grave crosses, 18th century, cross, 20th century; whole complex with Saint Wendelin's Chapel and former graveyard
- Saint Wendelin's Catholic Chapel – aisleless church, from 1798; grave cross, from 1551; whole complex with former graveyard and rectory
- On Landesstraße (State Road) 109 – wayside cross, from 1614
- Kaifenheimer Mühle (mill) – chapel; aisleless church, from 1895
- North of Kaifenheim – basalt wayside cross with Crucifixion group, from 1672
- Northeast of Kaifenheim – wayside cross, from 1646
