= Möntenich =

- Municipality
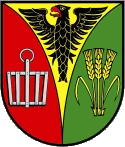
- Coat of arms

- Location of Möntenich within Cochem-Zell district
- Interactive map of Möntenich
- Location within Germany Location within Rhineland-Palatinate
- Coordinates: 50°13′23″N 7°18′2″E
- Country: Germany
- State: Rhineland-Palatinate
- District: Cochem-Zell
- Municipal assoc.: Kaisersesch

Government
  - Mayor (2019–24): Alois Knieper

Area
  - Total: 4.08 km^{2} (1.58 sq mi)
- Elevation: 230 m (750 ft)

Population (2025-12-31)
  - Total: 109
  - Density: 26.7/km^{2} (69.2/sq mi)
- Time zone: UTC+01:00 (CET)
  - Summer (DST): UTC+02:00 (CEST)
- Postal codes: 56754
- Dialling codes: 02672
- Vehicle registration: COC
- Website: www.moentenich.de

Möntenich is an Ortsgemeinde – a municipality belonging to a Verbandsgemeinde, a kind of collective municipality – in the Cochem-Zell district in Rhineland-Palatinate, Germany. It belongs to the Verbandsgemeinde of Kaisersesch.

== Geography ==
=== Location ===
The municipality lies in a dale at the edge of the Maifeld between the castles Pyrmont and Eltz.

== History ==
On 1 March 1285, Muntenich had its first documentary mention in Karden Canon Heinrich de Littore's will. Möntenich was an Imperial village and passed as a fief into the ownership of the Barons of Pyrmont. Later, it was an Electoral-Trier holding. Trier's lordship ended with the occupation of the lands on the Rhine’s left bank by French Revolutionary troops between 1794 and 1796. In 1815 Möntenich was assigned to the Kingdom of Prussia at the Congress of Vienna. Since 1946, it has been part of the then newly founded state of Rhineland-Palatinate.

== Politics ==
=== Municipal council ===
The council is made up of 6 council members, who were elected by majority vote at the municipal election held on 7 June 2009, and the honorary mayor as chairman.

=== Mayor ===
Möntenich's mayor is Alois Knieper.

=== Coat of arms ===
The German blazon reads: Schild durch eingeschweifte, gestürzte goldene Spitze, darin ein schwarzer rotgezungter Adler, gespalten; vorn in Rot ein silberner Rost, hinten in Grün nebeneinander drei goldene Ähren mit Halmen.

The municipality's arms might in English heraldic language be described thus: Tierced in mantle reversed, gules a gridiron argent, the handle to chief, Or an eagle displayed sable sans talons langued of the first, and vert three ears of wheat of the third.

The Imperial eagle recalls the Imperial lordship over Muntenich that lasted until the 16th century. The gridiron is Saint Lawrence's attribute, thus representing the municipality's and the church's patron saint, who has been venerated since the practice of Early Mass was established in 1775. The ears of wheat on the green field stand for agriculture, which can still be found in the municipality today. The village arose from a farming estate; as early as the 13th century, St. Maximin's Abbey in Trier was drawing income from this place.

The arms have been borne since 5 September 1989.

== Culture and sightseeing ==
=== Buildings ===
The following are listed buildings or sites in Rhineland-Palatinate’s Directory of Cultural Monuments:

- Eltzer Straße 1 – Saint Lawrence's Catholic Church (branch church; Filialkirche St. Laurentius); quarrystone aisleless church, 1850
- Hauptstraße/corner of Oberstraße – wayside chapel, 19th century
- Hauptstraße/corner of Pyrmonterstraße – Trinity relief, marked 1687
- Hauptstraße/corner of Pyrmonterstraße – fountain
- Weidgarten 1 – estate complex; great building with hipped mansard roof, 17th or 18th century, commercial wing, entrance gate
- At Weidgarten 1 – wayside cross fragment, marked 1712
- Weilerhof – chapel, 19th century; Gothic Revival gypsum figures
