= Hambuch =

- Municipality
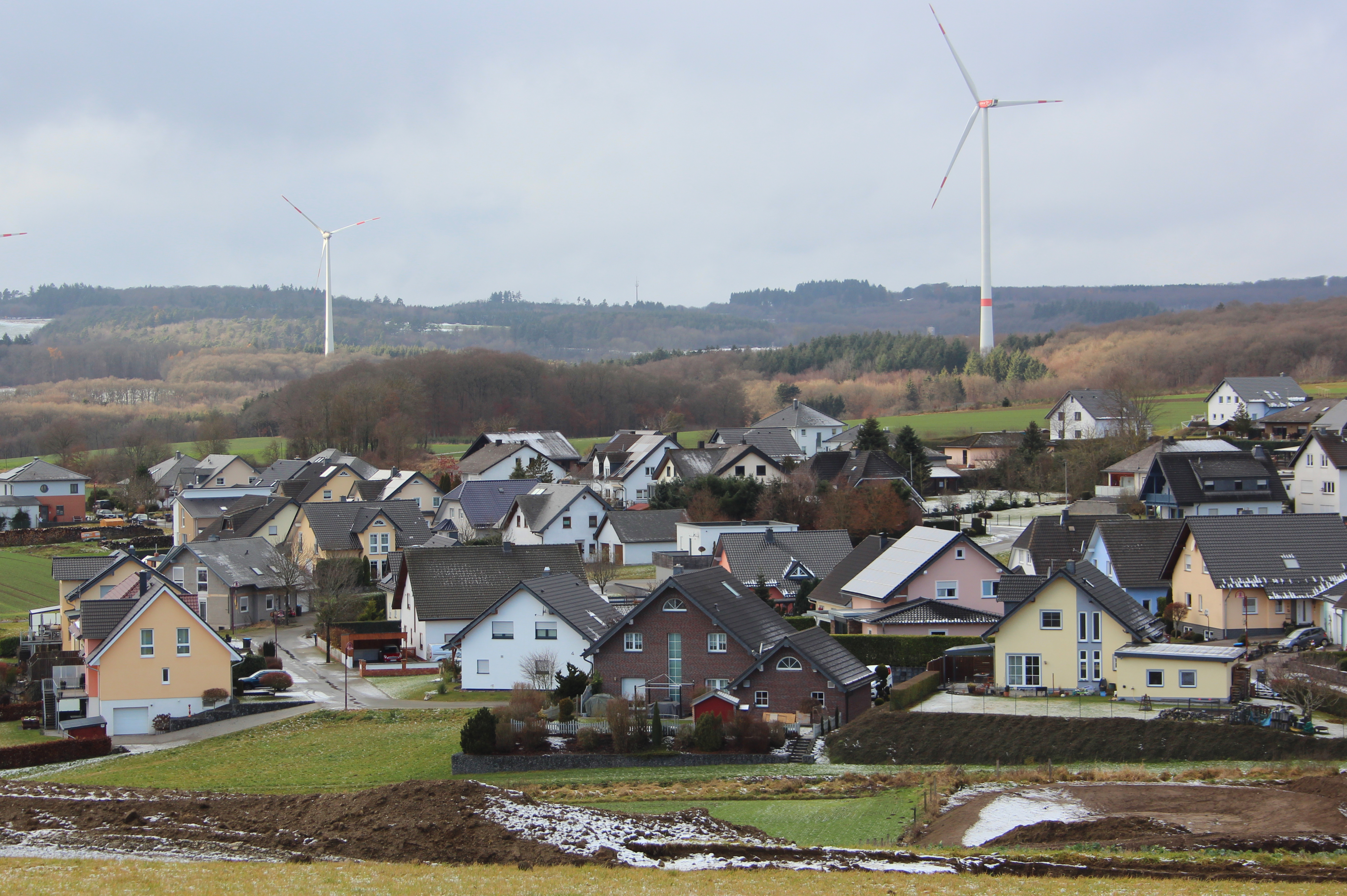

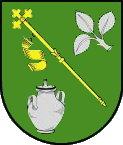
- Coat of arms

- Location of Hambuch within Cochem-Zell district
- Interactive map of Hambuch
- Location within Germany Location within Rhineland-Palatinate
- Coordinates: 50°13′33″N 7°10′57″E
- Country: Germany
- State: Rhineland-Palatinate
- District: Cochem-Zell
- Municipal assoc.: Kaisersesch

Government
  - Mayor (2019–24): Matthias Hetger

Area
  - Total: 4.81 km^{2} (1.86 sq mi)
- Elevation: 400 m (1,300 ft)

Population (2025-12-31)
  - Total: 717
  - Density: 149/km^{2} (386/sq mi)
- Time zone: UTC+01:00 (CET)
  - Summer (DST): UTC+02:00 (CEST)
- Postal codes: 56761
- Dialling codes: 02653
- Vehicle registration: COC

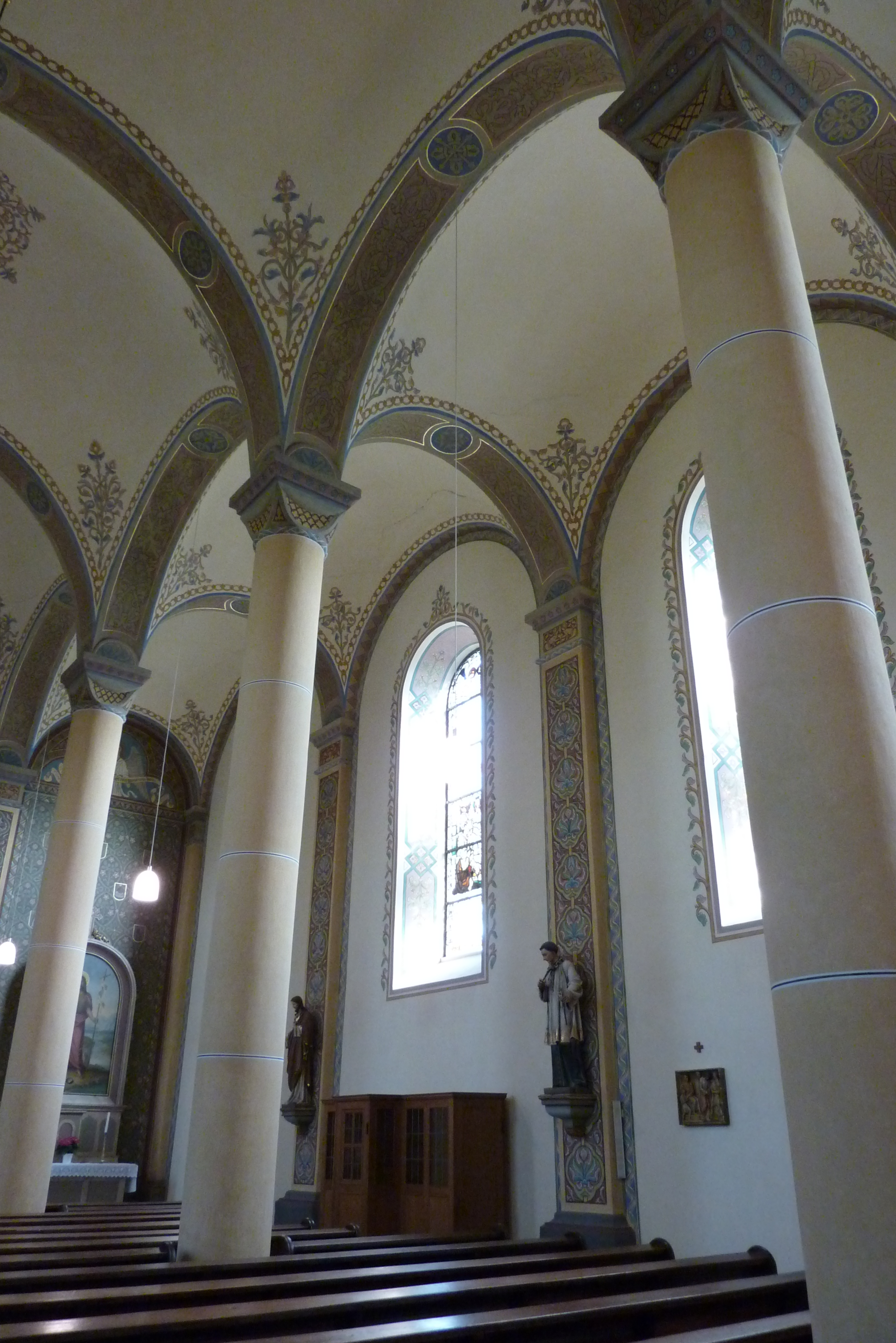
Saint John the Baptist's Parish Church in Hambuch

Hambuch is an Ortsgemeinde – a municipality belonging to a Verbandsgemeinde, a kind of collective municipality – in the Cochem-Zell district in Rhineland-Palatinate, Germany. It belongs to the Verbandsgemeinde of Kaisersesch, whose seat is in the like-named town.

== Geography ==
The municipality lies in the Eifel, on the Autobahn A 48.

== History ==
Hambuch's long history makes it one of the oldest settlements in the area. It had its first documentary mention as early as 866 when Abbot Ansbald of Prüm documented the donation of an estate in the village named Haganbahc in the Mayengau (the country around Mayen) by his monastery to the dowager Higilda. The donation, however, apparently did not include the village church. The mention of a church does, however, imply that the village was founded quite some time before 866, but there is no documentary evidence dating from before Abbot Ansbald's record.

The name “Hambuch” itself could have the following origins. The root word hag refers to an enclosed piece of land, which could be of any size, ringed with pollarded shrubs. Used for this would have been thorny shrubs such as hawthorn or dog rose, or thickly growing plants such as hornbeam, a sprig of which appears as a charge in the municipality's coat of arms. The —anbach ending might simply refer to the village's location near the brook (Bach in German) known as the Pommerbach.

The name changed often throughout time. Another spelling was to be seen in 893 in Prüm Abbey’s official directory of holdings, the Prümer Urbar. In 1222, Abbot Caesarius noted that the Count of Are had a valuable estate on the Mayfeld called Haynbahc. In the 12th century, the village was listed in the Carden Foundation’s directory of holdings under the name Hagenbach. In 1395, a document from Archbishop of Trier Werner records that he enfeoffed “Johann, the Lord at Daun” with a share of the court at Haenbach.

Other name variants recorded over time have been Hambach, Heimbach and Harnbach.

In the Middle Ages, the lordship over the village was held jointly, with half in Electoral-Trier hands and the other half shared between the Electorate of Cologne and the Counts of Leyen. The border between the two archbishoprics ran straight through the village. The two streets, Eulgemer Straße and Brunnenstraße, are even today perceived as a boundary of sorts, setting apart the Hinnewäldtje and the Ewwewäldtje, the local names for the lower and upper village respectively.

Beginning in 1794, Hambuch lay under French rule. In 1814 it was assigned to the Kingdom of Prussia at the Congress of Vienna. Since 1947, it has been part of the then newly founded state of Rhineland-Palatinate.

In 2005 the project Dorfakademie Hambuch, which had set itself the goal of “making life in the rural area even more attractive”, won first place in Rhineland-Palatinate's second volunteer contest, in which outstanding community projects earn recognition.

== Politics ==
=== Municipal council ===
The council is made up of 12 council members, who were elected by majority vote at the municipal election held on 7 June 2009, and the honorary mayor as chairman.

=== Mayor ===
Hambuch's mayor is Matthias Hetger.

=== Coat of arms ===
The municipality's arms might be described thus: Vert an abbot's staff with sudarium and ensigned with a cross bottonnée bendwise Or between, in sinister chief, a hornbeam twig couped and leafed of three and, in dexter base, an urn, both argent.

== Culture and sightseeing ==
=== Buildings ===
The following are listed buildings or sites in Rhineland-Palatinate’s Directory of Cultural Monuments:

- Saint John the Baptist’s Catholic Parish Church (Pfarrkirche St. Johannes der Täufer), Kirchstraße – aisleless church, 1847-1848, architect may have been Johann Claudius von Lassaulx; cross, 1852; graveyard, warriors’ memorial, 20th century
- Hauptstraße – basalt fountain, from 1859
- Hauptstraße 24 – relief, Hoffmann school (?), Baroque, from 1623
- Hauptstraße 36 – basalt cross, from 1719
- Kirchstraße – wayside cross, from 1724
- On Kreisstraße 23 – wayside cross
- Near the Hambucher Mühle (mill) – wayside cross, 17th century

== Economy and infrastructure ==
=== Education ===
Hambuch has one kindergarten and one primary school.
