= Brachtendorf =

- Municipality
- Coat of arms

- Location of Brachtendorf within Cochem-Zell district
- Interactive map of Brachtendorf
- Location within Germany Location within Rhineland-Palatinate
- Coordinates: 50°13′54.61″N 7°13′59.3″E
- Country: Germany
- State: Rhineland-Palatinate
- District: Cochem-Zell
- Municipal assoc.: Kaisersesch

Government
  - Mayor (2019–24): Eike Gries

Area
  - Total: 2.45 km^{2} (0.95 sq mi)
- Elevation: 300 m (980 ft)

Population (2025-12-31)
  - Total: 243
  - Density: 99.2/km^{2} (257/sq mi)
- Time zone: UTC+01:00 (CET)
  - Summer (DST): UTC+02:00 (CEST)
- Postal codes: 56761
- Dialling codes: 02653
- Vehicle registration: COC

Brachtendorf is an Ortsgemeinde – a municipality belonging to a Verbandsgemeinde, a kind of collective municipality – in the Cochem-Zell district in Rhineland-Palatinate, Germany. It belongs to the Verbandsgemeinde of Kaisersesch, whose seat is in the like-named town.

== Geography ==
The municipality lies in the Eifel roughly 5 km north of the river Moselle.

== History ==
Since 1946, Brachtendorf has been part of the then newly founded state of Rhineland-Palatinate.

== Politics ==
=== Municipal council ===
The council is made up of 6 council members, who were elected by majority vote at the municipal election held on 7 June 2009, and the honorary mayor as chairman.

=== Mayor ===
Brachtendorf's mayor is Eike Gries.

== Culture and sightseeing ==
=== Buildings ===
The following are listed buildings or sites in Rhineland-Palatinate’s Directory of Cultural Monuments:

- Saint Lambert’s Catholic Church (branch church; Filialkirche St. Lambertus), Hauptstraße 18 – quarrystone aisleless church, 1848-1849.

=== Poetry ===
In the early 1930s, the village schoolteacher at the time, named Siebenborn, was inspired to set pen to paper with these words:

German	English translation
Brachtendorf im Tal gelegen, an des Brohlbachs muntrem Lauf. Sanfte Hügel Dich umhegen; liebend fällt mein Blick darauf.	Brachtendorf, lying in the dale, on the Brohlbach's lively course. Gentle hills surround you; Lovingly falls my gaze thereon.

=== Clubs ===
Brachtendorf has a lively club life. Besides the two registered clubs, namely the Saint Sebastian Marksmen's Brotherhood (St. Sebastianus Schützenbruderschaft 1892 e.V.) with its local Brachtendorf chapter and the sport club (Sportverein Blaue Jungs e.V.), there are also the Möhnen (or “women fools”, a Shrovetide/Carnival tradition), the women's association and the volunteer fire brigade.
