= Peterswald-Löffelscheid =

- Municipality
- Coat of arms

- Location of Peterswald-Löffelscheid within Cochem-Zell district
- Interactive map of Peterswald-Löffelscheid
- Location within Germany Location within Rhineland-Palatinate
- Coordinates: 50°0′N 7°17′E
- Country: Germany
- State: Rhineland-Palatinate
- District: Cochem-Zell
- Municipal assoc.: Zell (Mosel)

Government
  - Mayor (2024–Present): Claudia Jakobs

Area
  - Total: 15.33 km^{2} (5.92 sq mi)
- Elevation: 450 m (1,480 ft)

Population (2025-12-31)
  - Total: 739
  - Density: 48.2/km^{2} (125/sq mi)
- Time zone: UTC+01:00 (CET)
  - Summer (DST): UTC+02:00 (CEST)
- Postal codes: 56858
- Dialling codes: 06545
- Vehicle registration: COC
- Website: www.zell-mosel.de

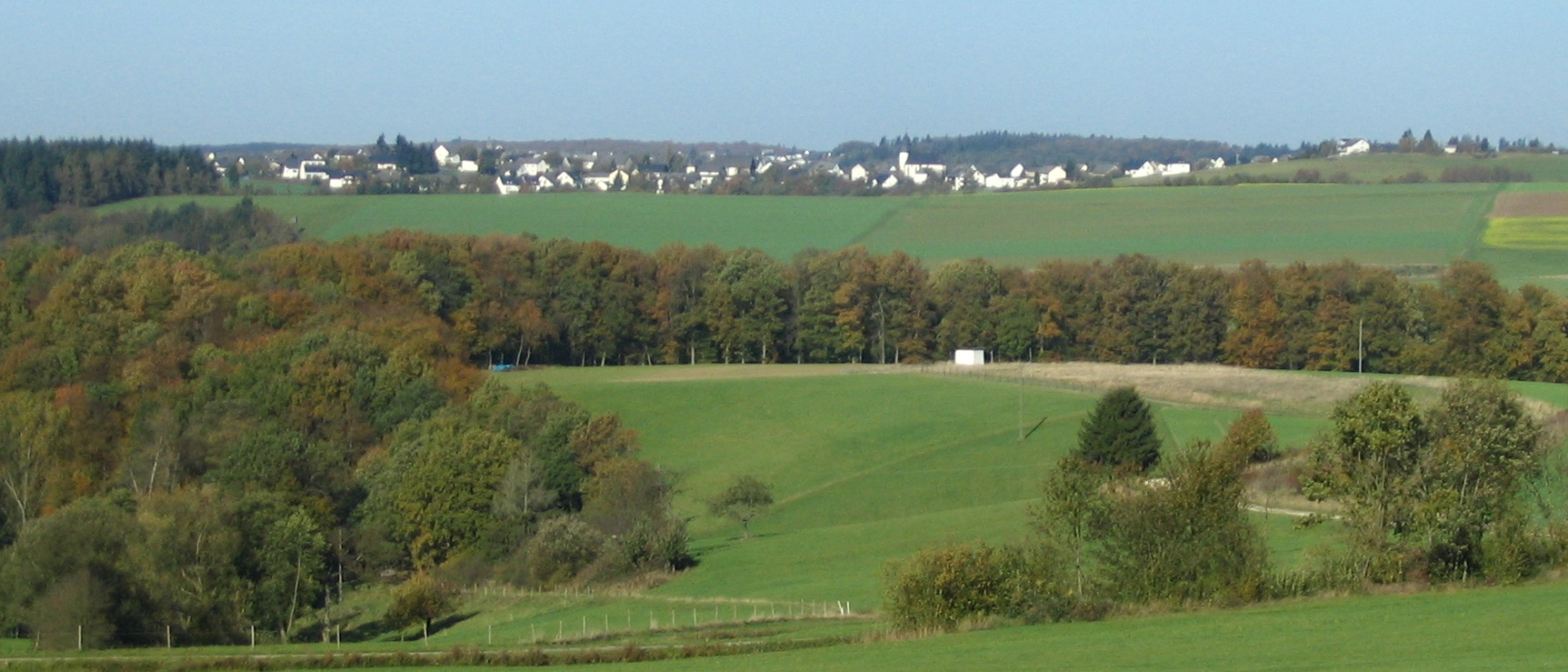
Peterswald

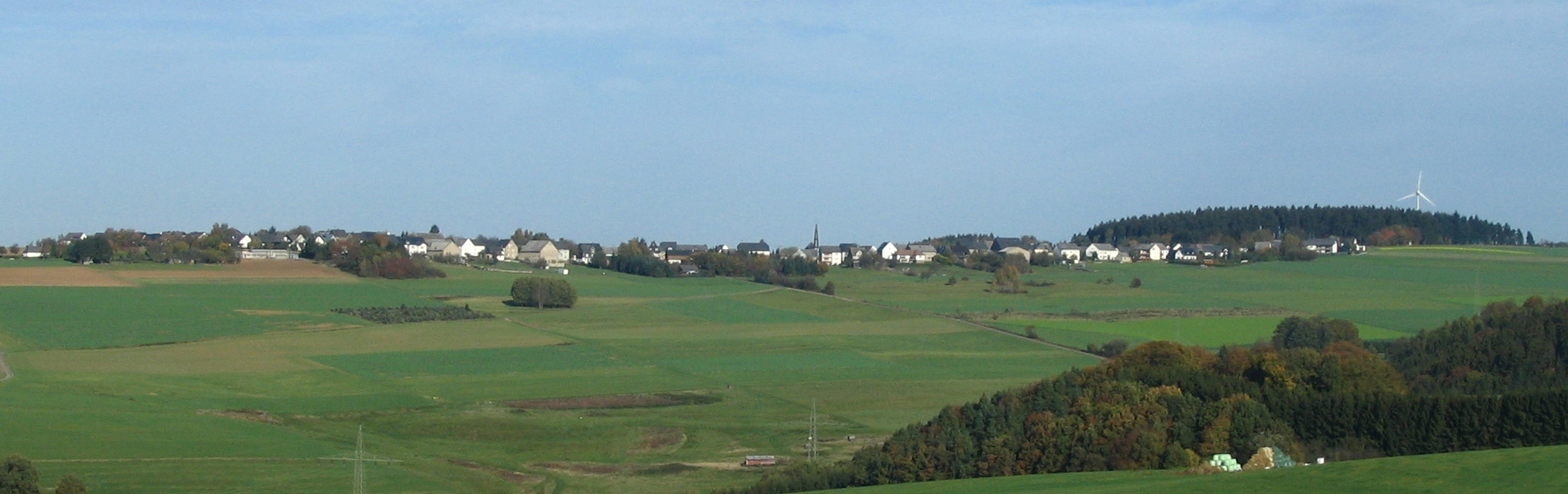
Löffelscheid

Peterswald-Löffelscheid (German pronunciation: [ˈpeːtɐsvalt ˈlœfl̩ʃaɪt]) is an Ortsgemeinde – a municipality belonging to a Verbandsgemeinde, a kind of collective municipality – in the Cochem-Zell district in Rhineland-Palatinate, Germany. It belongs to the Verbandsgemeinde of Zell, whose seat is in the municipality of Zell an der Mosel.

== Geography ==
=== Location ===
The municipality lies in the Hunsrück roughly 8 km east-southeast of Zell.

=== Constituent communities ===
As the municipality's name implies, there are two centres, or Ortsteile, named Peterswald and Löffelscheid.

== History ==
In 1233, the municipality had its first documentary mention as Silva s. Petri. A later mention calls it Petrusdorf. The two places both belonged to the “three-lord” territory, As in the Beltheim Court, the lordship was shared by the Electorate of Trier, the Counts of Sponheim and the family Braunshorn (later Winneburg and Metternich). In 1790, the lordship of Peterswald with the villages of Peterswald and Löffelscheid was assigned to the Counts of Metternich. Beginning in 1794, both places lay under French rule. In 1814 they were assigned to the Kingdom of Prussia at the Congress of Vienna. Since 1946, it has been part of the then newly founded state of Rhineland-Palatinate. On 7 November 1970 came the merger of the two municipalities into one.

== Politics ==
=== Municipal council ===
The council is made up of 12 council members, who were elected by majority vote at the municipal election held on 7 June 2009, and the honorary mayor as chairman.

=== Mayor ===
Peterswald-Löffelscheid's mayor is Kurt Mähser, and his deputies are Leo Jakobs and Joachim Emmel.

=== Coat of arms ===
The municipality's arms might be described thus: Tierced in mantle dexter vert two swords in saltire, the hilts to chief, argent, sinister a fleur-de-lis of the second, and in base argent a cross counter-compony argent and gules.

== Culture and sightseeing ==
=== Buildings ===
The following are listed buildings or sites in Rhineland-Palatinate’s Directory of Cultural Monuments:

==== Löffelscheid ====
- On Kreisstraße (District Road) 51 between Löffelscheid and Peterswald – Heiligenhäuschen (a small, shrinelike structure consecrated to a saint or saints)

==== Peterswald ====
- Saint Peter’s and Saint Paul’s Catholic Church (Kirche St. Peter und Paul), Zeller Straße – Baroque aisleless church, marked 1765 and 1766, west tower, 1923; Crucifixion group, late 19th century; whole complex (see also section below)
- Schulweg 2 – Quereinhaus (a combination residential and commercial house divided for these two purposes down the middle, perpendicularly to the street); timber-frame building, partly solid, 18th or 19th century
- Schulweg 6 – Hakenhof; timber-frame house, partly solid, about 1900

=== Church in Löffelscheid ===
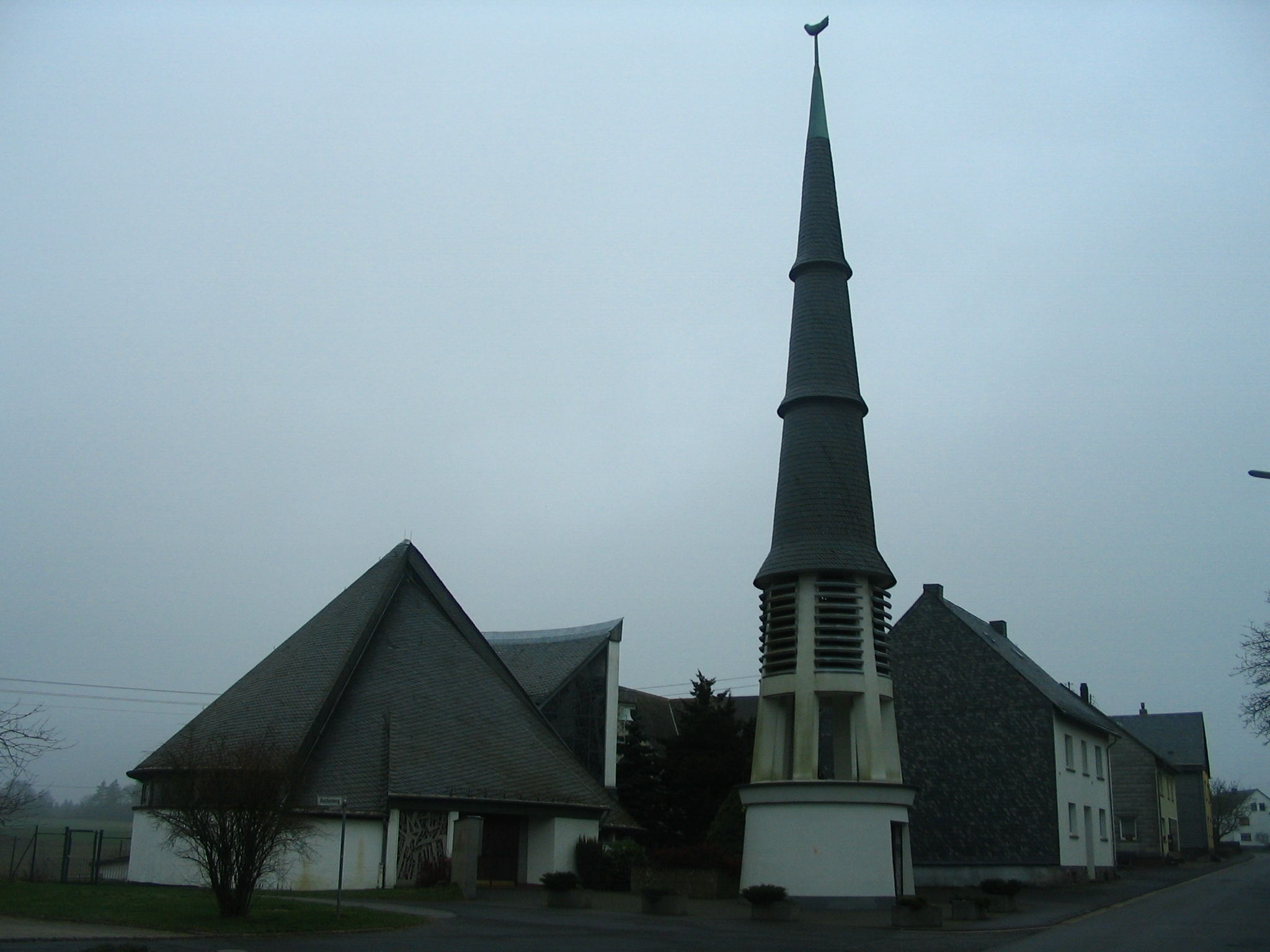
Church in Löffelscheid

The festive consecration of the new branch church in Löffelscheid, the Church of the Visitation (Maria Heimsuchung) was held on 5 July 1964. The patron is Mary, and a secondary patron is Saint Nicholas. The church is a round building (two cones were set into each other). The architect was Bruno Schönhagen of Koblenz. The high wall stands along with the old retable (Holy Trinity) as emblematic of the Mother of God, the Saints and Christ in the tabernacle. The smaller cone “bears” Salvation – the Eucharist – the altar and the confession chapel. The church's ceiling surrounds one like the protective mantle of the Mother of God. The pews stand in semicircular rows around the altar, which is a simple table made of red sandstone. The bell tower does not directly adjoin the church and has a height of 28 m.

=== Church in Peterswald ===
Today's church in Peterswald was built in 1765 and 1766. The church, built in the middle of the village, is an aisleless church with an offset quire. The former west gable got its current façade through tower construction in 1923. The bell tower's features include sound slats on all sides, a convexity in the upswept roof and a cross. The wall paintings of the very old altar show three versions of the Arrest of Jesus and the briefing of five Disciples. Worth seeing is an old bronze bell from 1463.

== Economy and infrastructure ==
=== Transport ===
Peterswald-Löffelscheid is linked to Blankenrath by bus route 761, run by the Verkehrsverbund Rhein-Mosel (“Rhine-Moselle Transport Association”). The municipality is also served by the Association's routes 321 and 669.

Only 5 km southwest of Peterswald-Löffelscheid lies Hahn. The constituent community of Löffelscheid lies within the Frankfurt-Hahn Airport noise protection zone, and is therefore subject to a certain amount of noise.
