= Schauren, Cochem-Zell =

Schauren
- Municipality
- Coat of arms

- Location of Schauren within Cochem-Zell district
- Interactive map of Schauren
- Location within Germany Location within Rhineland-Palatinate
- Coordinates: 50°1′26″N 7°16′12″E
- Country: Germany
- State: Rhineland-Palatinate
- District: Cochem-Zell
- Municipal assoc.: Zell (Mosel)

Government
  - Mayor (2019–24): Andreas Rössel

Area
  - Total: 3.05 km^{2} (1.18 sq mi)
- Elevation: 415 m (1,362 ft)

Population (2025-12-31)
  - Total: 410
  - Density: 130/km^{2} (350/sq mi)
- Time zone: UTC+01:00 (CET)
  - Summer (DST): UTC+02:00 (CEST)
- Postal codes: 56865
- Dialling codes: 06545
- Vehicle registration: COC

Schauren (German pronunciation: [ˈʃaʊʁən]) is an Ortsgemeinde – a municipality belonging to a Verbandsgemeinde, a kind of collective municipality – in the Cochem-Zell district in Rhineland-Palatinate, Germany. It belongs to the Verbandsgemeinde of Zell, whose seat is in the municipality of Zell an der Mosel.

== Geography ==
The municipality lies in the northern Hunsrück near Bundesstraße 421.

== History ==
In 1442, Schauren had its first documentary mention. In 1475, an estate was mentioned in a document that lay in Waldenhuysen und Schuren and was sold by Friedrich von Pyrmont to Friedrich Zandt von Merl. In the years 1625 to 1699, legal documents reported a high and village court in Schauren. Beginning in 1794, Schauren lay under French rule. In 1815 it was assigned to the Kingdom of Prussia at the Congress of Vienna. Until 1839, Schauren formed together with Walhausen a single municipality. Since 1946, it has been part of the then newly founded state of Rhineland-Palatinate. Under the Verwaltungsvereinfachungsgesetz (“Administration Simplification Law”) of 18 July 1970, with effect from 7 November 1970, the municipality was grouped into the Verbandsgemeinde of Zell.

== Politics ==
=== Municipal council ===
The council is made up of 8 council members, who were elected by majority vote at the municipal election held on 7 June 2009, and the honorary mayor as chairman.

=== Coat of arms ===
The municipality's arms might be described thus: Vert issuant from base two ears of rye, one bendwise, the other bendwise sinister, crossing each other per saltire in chief, in base a coronet, all Or.

== Culture and sightseeing ==
=== Buildings ===
The following are listed buildings or sites in Rhineland-Palatinate’s Directory of Cultural Monuments:

- The Virgin Mary's Catholic Chapel (Katholische Kapelle Jungfrau Maria) – aisleless church, 1796
- Hauptstraße 29 – Quereinhaus (a combination residential and commercial house divided for these two purposes down the middle, perpendicularly to the street); timber-frame house, partly solid, 18th century
- North of Schauren – wayside chapel; aisleless church, 19th century
