= Hesweiler =

- Municipality
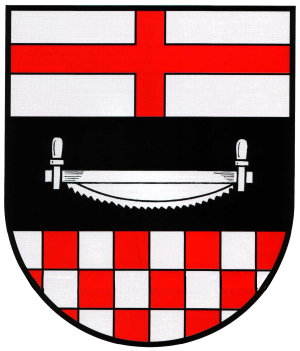
- Coat of arms

- Location of Hesweiler within Cochem-Zell district
- Interactive map of Hesweiler
- Location within Germany Location within Rhineland-Palatinate
- Coordinates: 50°2′40″N 7°16′54″E
- Country: Germany
- State: Rhineland-Palatinate
- District: Cochem-Zell
- Municipal assoc.: Zell (Mosel)

Government
  - Mayor (2019–24): Manfred Wilhelms

Area
  - Total: 2.31 km^{2} (0.89 sq mi)
- Elevation: 390 m (1,280 ft)

Population (2025-12-31)
  - Total: 114
  - Density: 49.4/km^{2} (128/sq mi)
- Time zone: UTC+01:00 (CET)
  - Summer (DST): UTC+02:00 (CEST)
- Postal codes: 56865
- Dialling codes: 06545
- Vehicle registration: COC

Hesweiler is an Ortsgemeinde – a municipality belonging to a Verbandsgemeinde, a kind of collective municipality – in the Cochem-Zell district in Rhineland-Palatinate, Germany. It belongs to the Verbandsgemeinde of Zell, whose seat is in the municipality of Zell an der Mosel.

== Geography ==
The municipality lies in the northern Hunsrück near Bundesstraße 421 and Blankenrath.

== History ==
In 1259, Hesweiler had its first documentary mention. The Counts of Sponheim held the court jurisdiction in the Hasericher Pflege (roughly “Haserich fostering”) until 1788. Beginning in 1794, Hesweiler was under French rule. In 1815, it was assigned to the Kingdom of Prussia at the Congress of Vienna. In 1848, the local chapel, consecrated to Saint Joseph, was built by the master builder Binzen from Zell. Since 1946, Hesweiler has been part of the then newly founded state of Rhineland-Palatinate. Under the Verwaltungsvereinfachungsgesetz (“Administration Simplification Law”) of 18 July 1970, with effect from 7 November 1970, the municipality was grouped into the Verbandsgemeinde of Zell.

== Politics ==
=== Municipal council ===
The council is made up of 6 council members, who were elected by majority vote at the municipal election held on 7 June 2009, and the honorary mayor as chairman.

=== Coat of arms ===
The municipality's arms might in English heraldic language be described thus: A fess sable charged with a saw argent, the whole between, in chief, argent a cross gules and, in base, chequy of twenty-four argent and gules.

== Culture and sightseeing ==
=== Buildings ===
The following are listed buildings or sites in Rhineland-Palatinate’s Directory of Cultural Monuments:

- Catholic Church, Hauptstraße – aisleless church, Rundbogenstil, 1848
- Hauptstraße 18 – Quereinhaus (a combination residential and commercial house divided for these two purposes down the middle, perpendicularly to the street); timber-frame building, partly solid or slated, half-hipped roof, 19th century
- Hauptstraße 30 – Quereinhaus; timber-frame building, partly solid, 18th century
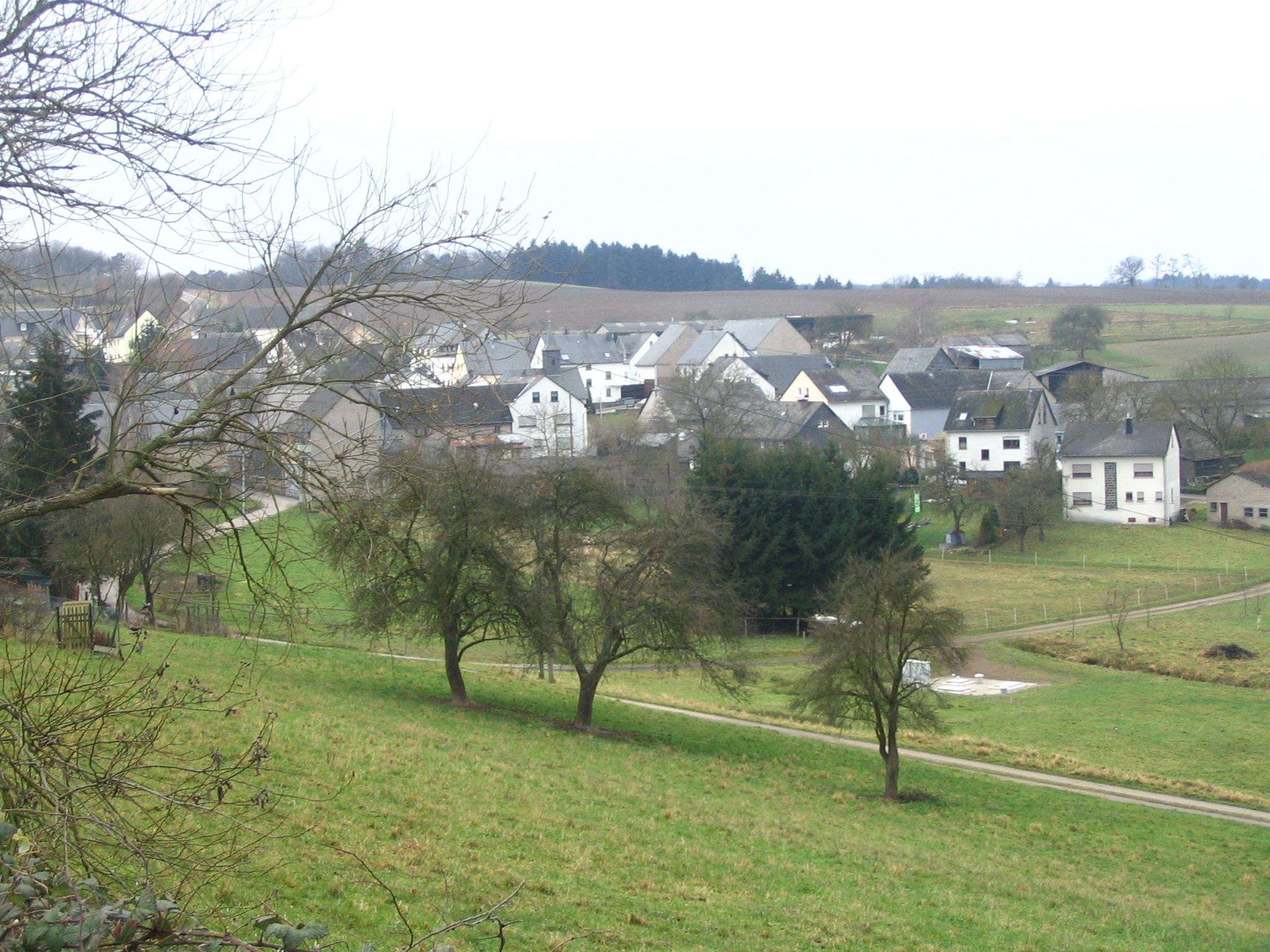
Hesweiler seen from the east

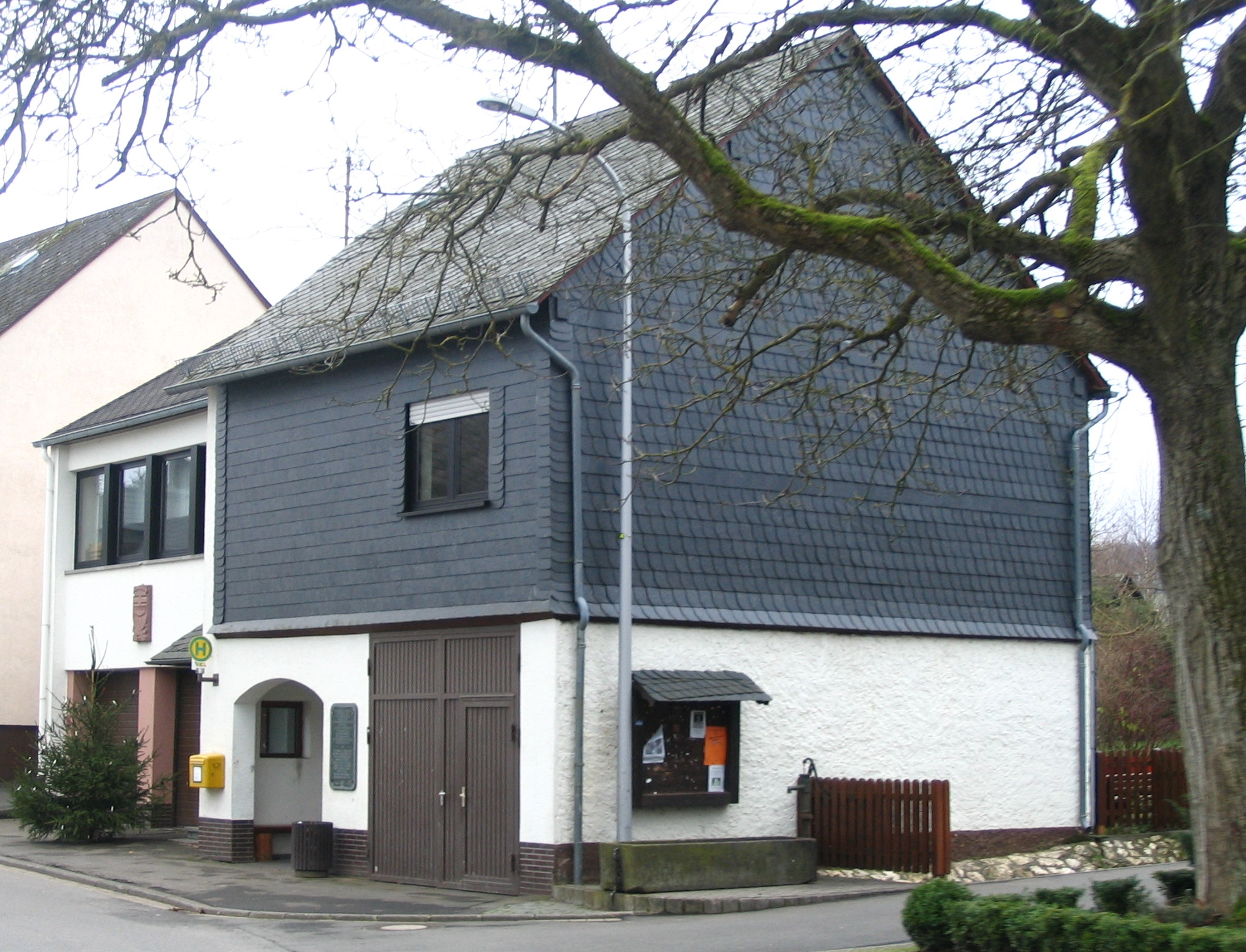
Community centre in the village centre

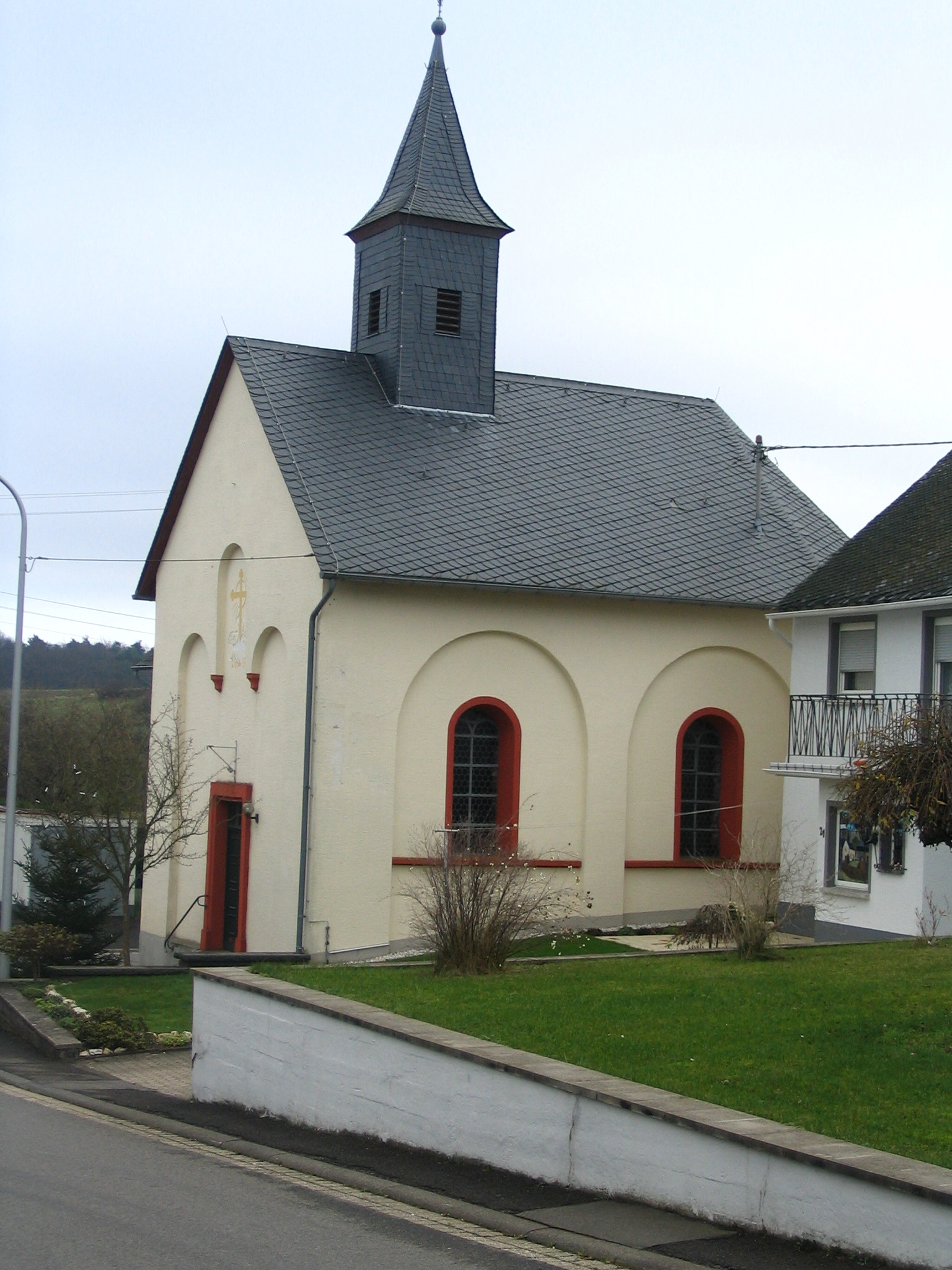
Hesweiler Chapel

== Economy and infrastructure ==
=== Transport ===
Hesweiler lies within the Verkehrsverbund Rhein-Mosel. Bus route 722 daily offers links to the nearest town, Zell (Mosel), and the nearest railway station, Bullay (DB), on the Moselstrecke (railway line) between Koblenz and Trier.
