= Panzweiler =

- Municipality
- Coat of arms

- Location of Panzweiler within Cochem-Zell district
- Interactive map of Panzweiler
- Location within Germany Location within Rhineland-Palatinate
- Coordinates: 50°1′18″N 7°18′23″E
- Country: Germany
- State: Rhineland-Palatinate
- District: Cochem-Zell
- Municipal assoc.: Zell (Mosel)

Government
  - Mayor (2019–24): Winfried Theisen

Area
  - Total: 3.85 km^{2} (1.49 sq mi)
- Elevation: 465 m (1,526 ft)

Population (2025-12-31)
  - Total: 263
  - Density: 68.3/km^{2} (177/sq mi)
- Time zone: UTC+01:00 (CET)
  - Summer (DST): UTC+02:00 (CEST)
- Postal codes: 56865
- Dialling codes: 06545
- Vehicle registration: COC

Panzweiler is an Ortsgemeinde – a municipality belonging to a Verbandsgemeinde, a kind of collective municipality – in the Cochem-Zell district in Rhineland-Palatinate, Germany. It belongs to the Verbandsgemeinde of Zell, whose seat is in the municipality of Zell an der Mosel.

== Geography ==
The municipality lies in the Hunsrück near Bundesstraße 421. The municipality's area amounts to 3.85 km², of which 1.32 km² is wooded.

== History ==
Panzweiler had documentary mentions in 1259 and 1276 as Panzwilre and belonged along with Blankenrath to the parish of Mastershausen. Beginning in 1794, Panzweiler lay under French rule. In 1814 it was assigned to the Kingdom of Prussia at the Congress of Vienna. Since 1946, it has been part of the then newly founded state of Rhineland-Palatinate. Under the Verwaltungsvereinfachungsgesetz (“Administration Simplification Law”) of 18 July 1970, with effect from 7 November 1970, the municipality was grouped into the Verbandsgemeinde of Zell.

== Politics ==
=== Municipal council ===
The council is made up of 6 council members, who were elected by majority vote at the municipal election held on 7 June 2009, and the honorary mayor as chairman.

=== Mayor ===
Panzweiler's mayor is Winfried Theisen, and his deputies are Bernd Klemm and Frank Sabel.

=== Coat of arms ===
The municipality's arms might be described thus: Tierced in mantle reversed, argent three bugle-horns in bend, bells to sinister, sable a bell surmounting a cross-staff bendwise, trailing from which a sudarium, all Or, and Or semée of crosses a bend dancetty gules.

== Culture and sightseeing ==
=== Buildings ===
The following are listed buildings or sites in Rhineland-Palatinate’s Directory of Cultural Monuments:

- Saint John the Baptist's Catholic Chapel (Kapelle St. Johannes Baptist) – aisleless church, marked 1791
- Johannisstraße 2 – Quereinhaus (a combination residential and commercial house divided for these two purposes down the middle, perpendicularly to the street); timber-frame building, partly solid or slated, 19th century
