= Hahn, Rhineland-Palatinate =

Hahn
- Municipality
- Coat of arms

- Location of Hahn within Rhein-Hunsrück-Kreis district
- Interactive map of Hahn
- Location within Germany Location within Rhineland-Palatinate
- Coordinates: 49°57′43″N 7°16′19″E
- Country: Germany
- State: Rhineland-Palatinate
- District: Rhein-Hunsrück-Kreis
- Municipal assoc.: Kirchberg

Government
  - Mayor (2019–24): Guido Schmittinger

Area
  - Total: 5.29 km^{2} (2.04 sq mi)
- Elevation: 472 m (1,549 ft)

Population (2025-12-31)
  - Total: 95
  - Density: 18/km^{2} (47/sq mi)
- Time zone: UTC+01:00 (CET)
  - Summer (DST): UTC+02:00 (CEST)
- Postal codes: 56850
- Dialling codes: 06543
- Vehicle registration: SIM
- Website: www.dorf-hahn.de

Hahn (German pronunciation: [haːn]) is an Ortsgemeinde – a municipality belonging to a Verbandsgemeinde, a kind of collective municipality – in the Rhein-Hunsrück-Kreis (district) in Rhineland-Palatinate, Germany. It belongs to the Verbandsgemeinde of Kirchberg, whose seat is in the like-named town. The name Hahn is well known as being the name shared with Frankfurt-Hahn Airport, which arose after 1993 from the United States Air Force’s Hahn Air Base once the Americans had withdrawn.

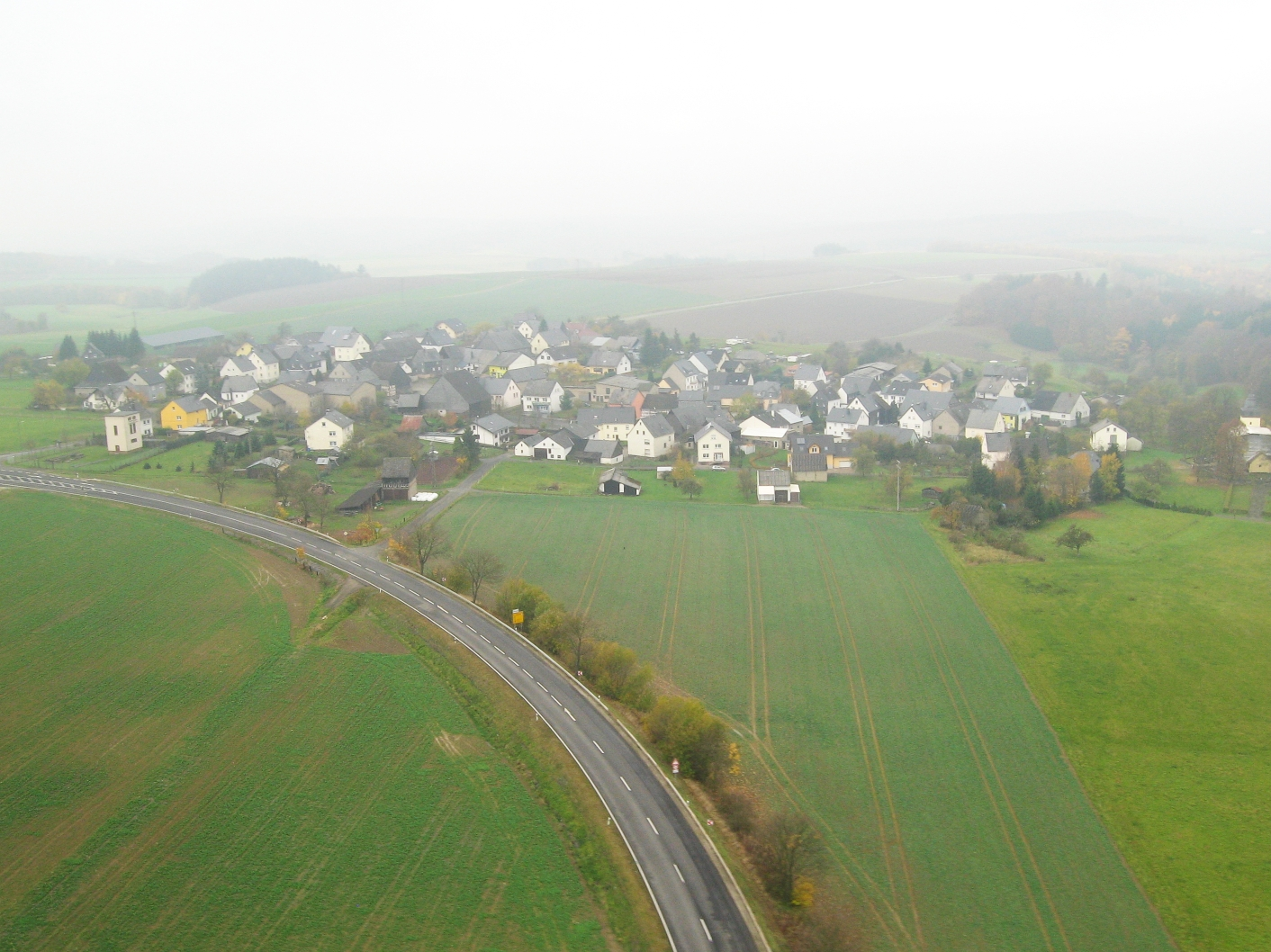
Hahn – view from the east

== Geography ==
=== Location ===
The municipality lies on a ridge in the part of the Hunsrück facing the Moselle on the watershed between the Nahe and the Moselle, and also on the Hunsrückhöhenstraße ("Hunsrück Heights Road", a scenic road across the Hunsrück built originally as a military road on Hermann Göring's orders). The Wilwersbach rises in Hahn.

== History ==
Within Hahn’s municipal limits are traces of Roman and Frankish settlement. The placename Hahn, originally written Hagene (1120), and later also Haan, Han, Hane, and Hain, originally meant, according to the Rhenish toponym researcher Heinrich Dittmaier, “wattled fence”, then later “enclosed dwelling place”. In 1120, Hagene had its first documentary mention in connection with Lötzbeuren, Pünderich and Karden in a donation document made out to Mettlach Abbey. It was mentioned a second time about 1330 or 1335 in the Sponheim taxation register. Beginning in 1794, Hahn lay under French rule. In 1815 it was assigned to the Kingdom of Prussia at the Congress of Vienna. Since 1946, it has been part of the then newly founded state of Rhineland-Palatinate. After the Second World War, an air base was built on parts of the municipal area. This was converted for civil aviation in 1993 after the United States Air Force withdrew from the base. It is now called Frankfurt-Hahn Airport (or Flughafen Frankfurt-Hahn in German).

== Hahn and the airport ==
Hahn suffered for many years under the noise from military jets taking off and landing, but also benefitted from jobs at the air base and from opportunities to let properties in the surrounding area out. The latter benefit shrank sharply after the Americans withdrew from Hahn. Although civil aircraft are not quite as noisy as the air force jets were, Hahn still lies within the noise protection zone because of the 24-hour-a-day air traffic overhead, which has hindered plans to expand the village with new building developments.

== Religion ==
Hahn’s Evangelical parish, to which the Briedeler Heck also belonged, merged on 1 January 1978 with the Evangelical parish of Würrich, and today this is also tied administratively with the parish of Zell-Bad Bertrich-Blankenrath and belongs to the church district of Simmern-Trarbach. Saint Michael’s in Sohren tends to the Catholic community’s needs in Hahn.

== Politics ==
=== Municipal council ===
The council is made up of 6 council members, who were elected by majority vote at the municipal election held on 7 June 2009, and the honorary mayor as chairman.

=== Mayor ===
Hahn’s mayor is Guido Schmittinger.

=== Coat of arms ===
The German blazon reads: In Blau ein goldener Schrägrechtbalken, belegt mit einem schwarzen aufsteigenden Düsenjäger. Vorn drei goldene Getreidehalme mit Ähren und Blättern, hinten gekreuzt ein goldener Hammer und ein goldener Schlägel.

The municipality’s arms might in English heraldic language be described thus: Azure a bend Or charged with a fighter jet sable, the whole between three ears of wheat with stems conjoined, leafed and couped, one stem each bendwise, palewise and bendwise sinister, and a hammer and sledge per saltire, all of the second.

The field tinctures azure and Or (blue and gold) refer to the village’s former allegiance to the “Further” County of Sponheim, which between 1248 and 1437 held the lordship here, and which bore these tinctures in its arms. The fighter jet on the bend (diagonal stripe) refers to the former NATO air base at Hahn, built in 1951, but now given over to civilian use. The three ears of wheat stand for the centuries-old practice of agriculture in the municipality. The crossed mining tools stand for slate mining, which for a time was historical, but it is now once more undertaken.

The arms have been borne since 4 December 1986, and were designed by Harald Kaspar, a glass artist who lived in Hahn at the time, but who has since moved to Kappel.

== Culture and sightseeing ==
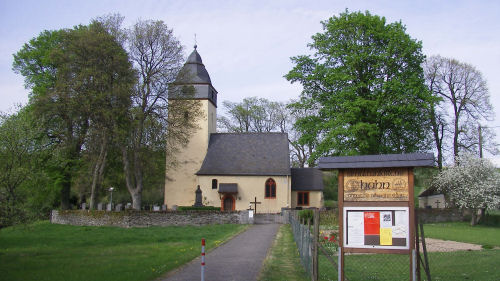
Simultaneous church, Saint Anthony’s

=== Buildings ===
The following are listed buildings or sites in Rhineland-Palatinate’s Directory of Cultural Monuments:

- Saint Anthony’s Simultaneous Church (Simultankirche St. Antonius), An der Gass – quire, west tower, parts of the once three-naved main hall, late 13th century, Late Gothic tracery windows, spire (wooden tub), 18th century; whole complex with graveyard (see also below)
- An der Gass 15 – timber-frame house, hipped mansard roof, about 1800

==== The church ====
The building worthiest of note is the little village church. Saint Anthony’s Simultaneous Church has a churchtower that looks rather like a defensive structure, reckoned by dendrochronological dating to come from the time between 1350 and 1370. The nave and quire date from 1470. Two bronze bells come from 1489, according to the inscription (one bell was recast because it had cracked). In a 1508 document, the church is called a “rectorate at Hahn”. Before the Reformation, the church was in Sohren’s care in the rural chapter of Glan in the Archbishopric of Mainz. Today Hahn belongs once again as a branch church to Sohren and the Diocese of Trier. The church has been since 17 May 1689 a simultaneous church and is used by both Catholics and Evangelicals. It is the second oldest simultaneous church in the Evangelical Church in the Rhineland.

The Evangelical territory of Palatinate-Simmern had passed after Charles II’s death without a direct heir to the Palatinate-Neuburg line, which had only a short time earlier become Catholic. The designated successor, Philip William had nevertheless promised religious freedom. After the promotion of the Catholic Church and in many cases the abolition of Evangelical parishes in the time of the Nine Years' War (known in Germany as the Pfälzischer Erbfolgekrieg, or War of the Palatine Succession) with France, a settlement was reached in the 1697 Treaty of Ryswick whereby the Catholic side enjoyed support from Johann Wilhelm, Elector Palatine. In many municipalities in the Palatinate, simultaneous churches were built. So many of them were later abolished in the course of industrialization between 1880 and 1910 that the smaller denomination in each case built its own church. This happened in neighbouring Kappel. In the little village of Hahn, however, there was no need. On the information display board before the church, there is a reference to the Gospel According to John: Damit sie alle eins seien – "That they all may be one" (John 17:21).

Since 1980, the church has been under monumental protection. Since 1998, the municipality has been floodlighting the church at night so that it can be seen even by passing motorists on the Hunsrückhöhenstraße.

=== Regular events ===
The kermis (church consecration festival) in church patron Anthony the Great's honour is celebrated on 17 January by all Hahners as a village festival.
