= Grenderich =

- Municipality
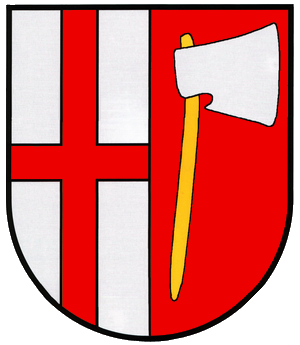
- Coat of arms

- Location of Grenderich within Cochem-Zell district
- Interactive map of Grenderich
- Location within Germany Location within Rhineland-Palatinate
- Coordinates: 50°3′56.88″N 7°13′40.67″E
- Country: Germany
- State: Rhineland-Palatinate
- District: Cochem-Zell
- Municipal assoc.: Zell (Mosel)

Government
  - Mayor (2019–24): Wolfgang Wallrath

Area
  - Total: 8.51 km^{2} (3.29 sq mi)
- Elevation: 400 m (1,300 ft)

Population (2025-12-31)
  - Total: 380
  - Density: 45/km^{2} (120/sq mi)
- Time zone: UTC+01:00 (CET)
  - Summer (DST): UTC+02:00 (CEST)
- Postal codes: 56858
- Dialling codes: 02673
- Vehicle registration: COC, ZEL

Grenderich is an Ortsgemeinde – a municipality belonging to a Verbandsgemeinde, a kind of collective municipality – in the Cochem-Zell district in Rhineland-Palatinate, Germany. It belongs to the Verbandsgemeinde of Zell, whose seat is in the municipality of Zell an der Mosel.

== Geography ==
Grenderich lies on an interfluve in the northern Hunsrück some 5 km from the river Moselle.

== History ==
In 1238, Grenderich apparently had its first documentary mention. It was until 1781 part of the “Three-Lord Territory”. As in the Beltheim court, the landlordship was shared among the Electorate of Trier, the County of Sponheim and the House of Braunshorn (later Winneburg and Metternich). Beginning in 1794, Grenderich lay under French rule. In 1815 it was assigned to the Kingdom of Prussia at the Congress of Vienna.

The foundation stone for the Grenderich church was laid in 1870. The new building was completed in 1872 to plans drawn up by the district master builder Schmitt from Cochem.

Since 1946, Grenderich has been part of the then newly founded state of Rhineland-Palatinate. Under the Verwaltungsvereinfachungsgesetz (“Administration Simplification Law”) of 18 July 1970, with effect from 7 November 1970, the municipality was grouped into the Verbandsgemeinde of Zell.

At the same time as the Pydna missile base was being built in the 1980s, a Patriot missile base was built within Grenderich’s limits. This base was abandoned in 1990 and the unit moved to the Middle East to be deployed in the Gulf War.

== Politics ==
=== Municipal council ===
The council is made up of 8 council members, who were elected by majority vote at the municipal election held on 26 May 2019, and the honorary mayor as chairman.

=== Mayor ===
Grenderich’s mayor is Wolfgang Wallrath, and his deputies are Stefan Korneli and Dennis Kürbis.

=== Coat of arms ===
The municipality’s arms might be described thus: Per pale argent a cross gules and gules an axe argent, the edge to sinister, helved Or.

== Culture and sightseeing ==
=== Buildings ===
The following are listed buildings or sites in Rhineland-Palatinate’s Directory of Cultural Monuments:

- Saint Matthew’s Catholic Church (Kirche St. Matthias), Hauptstraße: Gothic Revival hall church, 1870-1872; modern campanile
- Graveyard; graveyard cross, from 1860
- Hauptstraße 34: Quereinhaus (a combination residential and commercial house divided for these two purposes down the middle, perpendicularly to the street); timber-frame building, partly solid, 19th century

== Economy and infrastructure ==
=== Transport ===
Grenderich is linked to the long-distance road network by Bundesstraße 421 about 6 km to the south. The nearest railway station is Bullay (DB) on the Moselstrecke (railway line), lying roughly 11 km to the west.

== Sundry ==
Between the villages of Grimburg and Gusenburg in the Trier-Saarburg district, also in Rhineland-Palatinate, once lay another place called Grenderich. It vanished at the time of the Thirty Years' War.
