= Reidenhausen =

- Municipality
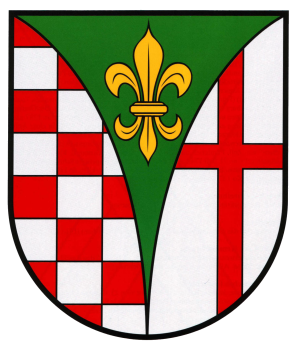
- Coat of arms

- Location of Reidenhausen within Cochem-Zell district
- Interactive map of Reidenhausen
- Location within Germany Location within Rhineland-Palatinate
- Coordinates: 50°3′30″N 7°19′1″E
- Country: Germany
- State: Rhineland-Palatinate
- District: Cochem-Zell
- Municipal assoc.: Zell (Mosel)

Government
  - Mayor (2019–24): Christian Klemm

Area
  - Total: 2.06 km^{2} (0.80 sq mi)
- Elevation: 445 m (1,460 ft)

Population (2025-12-31)
  - Total: 177
  - Density: 85.9/km^{2} (223/sq mi)
- Time zone: UTC+01:00 (CET)
  - Summer (DST): UTC+02:00 (CEST)
- Postal codes: 56865
- Dialling codes: 06545
- Vehicle registration: COC
- Website: www.reidenhausen.de

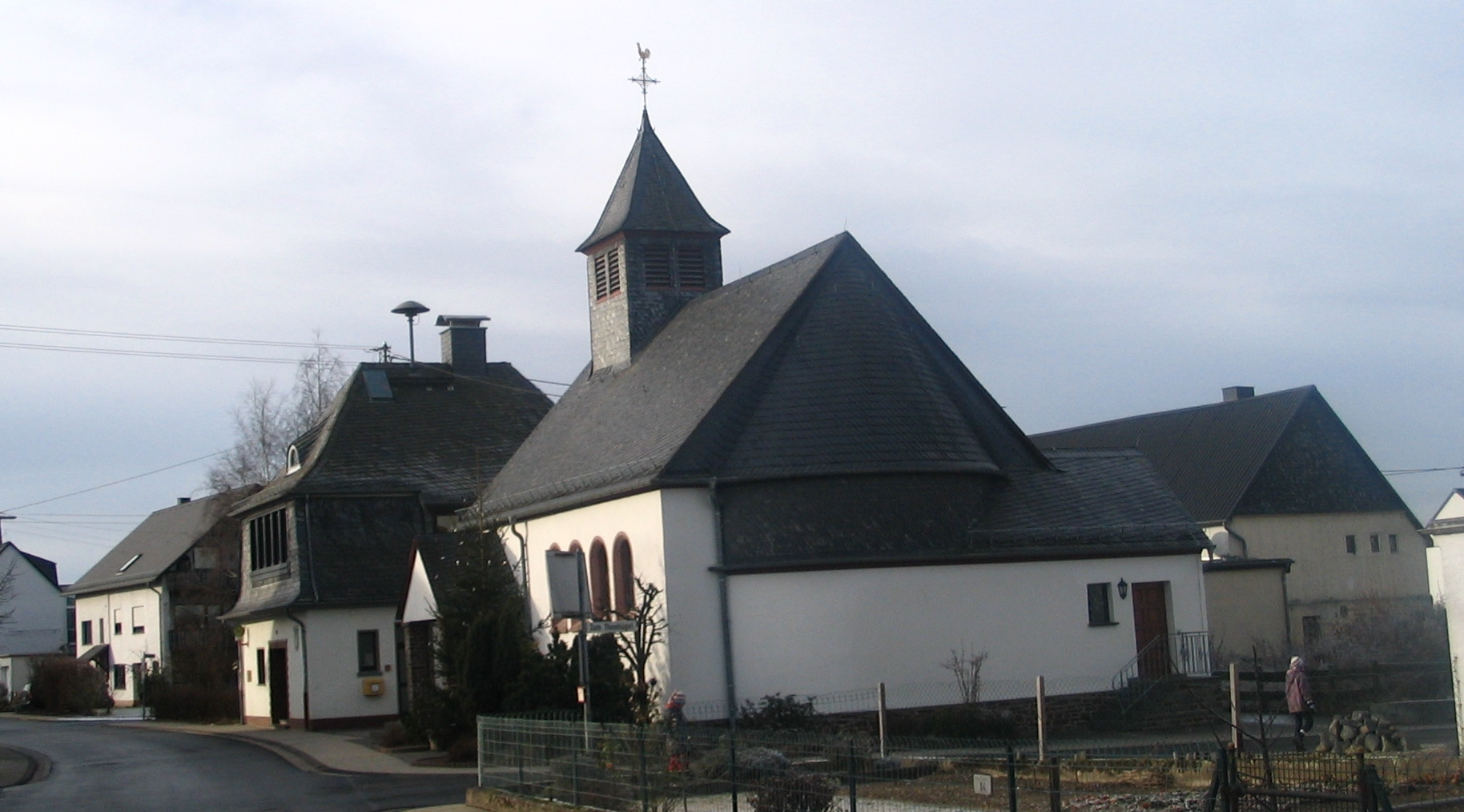
Reidenhausen's church and parish centre

Reidenhausen is an Ortsgemeinde – a municipality belonging to a Verbandsgemeinde, a kind of collective municipality – in the Cochem-Zell district in Rhineland-Palatinate, Germany. It belongs to the Verbandsgemeinde of Zell, whose seat is in the municipality of Zell an der Mosel.

== Geography ==
The municipality lies on some heights in the northern Hunsrück.

== History ==
About 1310, Reudinhusin had its first documentary mention. Reidenhausen (sometimes also Rodenhausen), which together with Blankenrath formed a single municipality, was under French rule in 1794 separated from its neighbour. In 1814 Reidenhausen was assigned to the Kingdom of Prussia at the Congress of Vienna. Since 1946, it has been part of the then newly founded state of Rhineland-Palatinate. Under the Verwaltungsvereinfachungsgesetz ("Administration Simplification Law") of 18 July 1970, with effect from 7 November 1970, the municipality was grouped into the Verbandsgemeinde of Zell.

== Politics ==
=== Municipal council ===
The council is made up of 6 council members, who were elected by majority vote at the municipal election held on 7 June 2009, and the honorary mayor as chairman.

=== Mayor ===
Reidenhausen's mayor is Christian Klemm.

=== Coat of arms ===
The German blazon reads: Das Wappen der Ortsgemeinde Reidenhausen besteht aus einer eingeschweiften gestürzten Spitze, darin in Grün eine goldene Lilie, gespalten; vorne rot-silbern geschacht, hinten in Silber ein rotes Balkenkreuz.

The municipality's arms might in English heraldic language be described thus: Tierced in mantle reversed, dexter chequy of 21 argent and gules, sinister argent a cross of the second, and in chief vert a fleur-de-lis Or.

Ever since there has been a chapel here, the patron has been Mary, whose attribute is the charge in chief, the lily. The field tincture vert (green) is held to refer to what was for centuries the only livelihood in the village, agriculture. The "chequy" pattern on the dexter (armsbearer's right, viewer's left) side is drawn from the arms formerly borne by the Counts of Sponheim, who until the 18th century laid claim to the whole of the Hunsrück. The red cross on the sinister (armsbearer's left, viewer's right) side was the heraldic device borne by the Electorate of Trier, the former feudal overlord.

== Culture and sightseeing ==
=== Buildings ===
The following are listed buildings or sites in Rhineland-Palatinate's Directory of Cultural Monuments:

- Chapel to the Assumption of Mary (Kapelle Zur Himmelfahrt Mariens) – aisleless church, 1950s
