= Senheim =

- Municipality
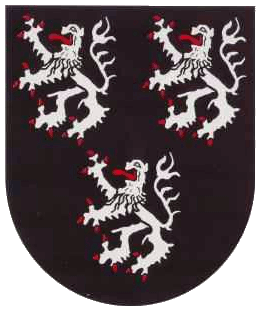
- Coat of arms

- Location of Senheim within Cochem-Zell district
- Interactive map of Senheim
- Location within Germany Location within Rhineland-Palatinate
- Coordinates: 50°5′8″N 7°12′47″E
- Country: Germany
- State: Rhineland-Palatinate
- District: Cochem-Zell
- Municipal assoc.: Cochem
- Subdivisions: 2

Government
  - Mayor (2019–24): Volker Ahnen

Area
  - Total: 12.58 km^{2} (4.86 sq mi)
- Elevation: 91 m (299 ft)

Population (2025-12-31)
  - Total: 557
  - Density: 44.3/km^{2} (115/sq mi)
- Time zone: UTC+01:00 (CET)
  - Summer (DST): UTC+02:00 (CEST)
- Postal codes: 56820
- Dialling codes: 02673
- Vehicle registration: COC
- Website: www.senheim.de

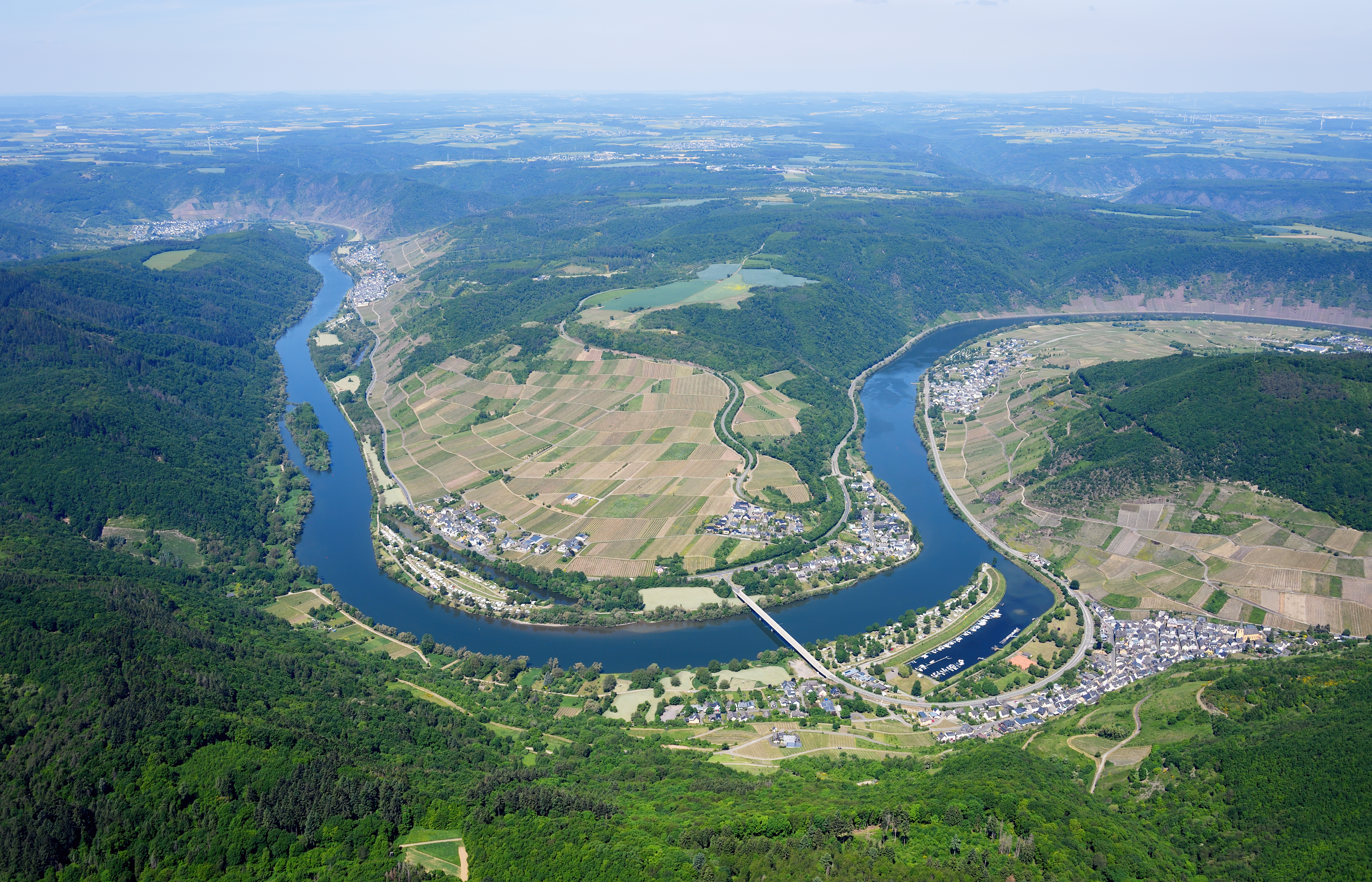
Aerial view of Senheim

Senheim is an Ortsgemeinde – a municipality belonging to a Verbandsgemeinde, a kind of collective municipality – in the Cochem-Zell district in Rhineland-Palatinate, Germany. It belongs to the Verbandsgemeinde of Cochem, whose seat is in the like-named town.

== Geography ==
=== Location ===
The municipality lies on both banks of the river Moselle. The bigger of the two centres, also called Senheim, lies on the right bank at the foot of the Hunsrück, while the considerably smaller centre of Senhals lies on the left bank, or the “Eifel side”. The two centres have been linked by bridge since 1967.

=== Constituent communities ===
Senheim's Ortsteile are Senheim and Senhals.

== History ==
The earliest record, from 1067, establishes the existence of holdings of the Cologne Church in Senhals. Senheim had its first documentary mention in 1140.

Three lords held sway in Senheim, namely the Elector of Trier, the Count of Sponheim and the Lords of Braunshorn-Metternich-Beilstein.

Senheim-Senhals was in the Middle Ages an important way station on the trade road that ran from the Netherlands through the Eifel by way of Senheim, through the Hunsrück and on to Frankfurt am Main and Augsburg. As far back as the Middle Ages, Senheimers earned their livelihood in winegrowing and agriculture (using a kind of shifting cultivation). It can be seen from the 1702 Electoral-Trier taxation statistics that vineyard holdings in the church's and the nobility's hands amounted to 300,000 vines. Winemakers held 200,000. The Sponheims held the other 100,000.

Beginning in 1778, the Electorate of Trier was the sole landholder. During the French Revolutionary Wars, the region was occupied by French troops in 1793 and 1794. In 1798, the region was made part of the Department of Rhin-et-Moselle, and thereby became part of France. In 1815 it was assigned to the Kingdom of Prussia at the Congress of Vienna.

The Senheim of the 17th and 18th centuries with its fortifications, towers, crenellations and gates, and its great number of stately noble and monastic estates, came to a sudden end on 13 August 1839: a great fire reduced the mediaeval village in a short time to ashes and rubble. Burnt down in this catastrophe were 106 houses, 22 winepress houses and 7 barns. The Catholic church, built in 1075 with its grand Baroque altar by Januarius Zick and the rectory came through the fire unscathed. When reconstruction was undertaken, an extensive plan was developed which left 30 local families without a place to live in the village. For them, a new, outlying centre was established up on the Hunsrück's heights. It was named the “colony” of Hoch-Senheim (hoch means “high” in German), although soon after it was finished, it was given the name Moritzheim to honour its sponsor, the Landrat (district chairman) Moritz.

Since 1946, Senheim has been part of the then newly founded state of Rhineland-Palatinate. Under the Verwaltungsvereinfachungsgesetz (“Administration Simplification Law”) of 18 July 1970, with effect from 7 November 1970, the municipality was grouped into the Verbandsgemeinde of Cochem.

== Politics ==
=== Municipal council ===
The council is made up of 12 council members, who were elected by majority vote at the municipal election held on 7 June 2009, and the honorary mayor as chairman.

=== Mayor ===
Senheim's mayor is Volker Ahnen.

=== Coat of arms ===
The German blazon reads: Das Wappen der Gemeinde Senheim zeigt in Schwarz drei (2 : 1) rotbewehrte silberne Löwen..

The municipality's arms might in English heraldic language be described thus: Sable three lions rampant argent armed and langued gules.

=== Town partnerships ===
Senheim fosters partnerships with the following places:

- (Germany) Recklinghausen, Recklinghausen, North Rhine-Westphalia
- (Germany) Kirchhellen, district-free city of Bottrop, North Rhine-Westphalia

Both these partnerships have been in place since 1935, and both take the form of a sponsorship, whose main aim is to “stabilize” Senheim's wine festival and other local events through participation of people from these two sponsoring places.

== Culture and sightseeing ==
=== Buildings ===
The following are listed buildings or sites in Rhineland-Palatinate’s Directory of Cultural Monuments:

==== Senheim (main centre) ====
- Saint Remigius’s Catholic Church (Kirche St. Remigius), Kirchplatz 1 – Late Romanesque west tower with Late Gothic cupola; Baroque aisleless church, 1765-1769, architect Paul Stähling, Strasbourg; graveyard: basalt niche cross, marked 1615; cast-iron missionary cross, marked 1855; six grave crosses, 1689, 18th century; grotto with Madonna figure, 19th century; Crucifixion group as tomb, 20th century; Neoclassical tomb, 1910; funerary chapel: wayside cross pedestal with relief, 18th century; in the graveyard wall: relief of Saint Remigius, 18th century; wayside cross fragment, 17th century (?); northeast of the church walled Baroque cross garden, marked 1784
- Altmai 16 – timber-frame house, partly solid, plastered, marked 1774, wall gable, 16th century; three-floor timber-frame addition, partly solid, plastered, 17th century
- Altmai 20 – winemaker’s estate; plastered building, about 1840
- Altmai 21 – basalt arch, marked 1613
- Am Gestade 6 – former school; quarrystone building, 19th century
- Am Gestade 55 – building with hipped mansard roof, marked 1786, hotel porch
- Brunnenstraße – warriors’ memorial, pylon with lion
- Brunnenstraße 106 – former rectory; building with half-hipped roof, mid 19th century
- Drillesplatz – Crucifixion group, sandstone relief, 1726
- Kirchhellener Straße 39 – timber-frame house, partly solid, 19th century
- Marktstraße 57 – winemaker's house; quarrystone building, half-hipped roof, 19th century
- Vogtei 75/86 – two quarrystone buildings, half-hipped roof, marked 1840
- Vogtei 149 – former Vogtei; Romanesque dwelling tower, dendrochronologically dated to 1240 ± 5 years
- Vogtei/corner of Zeller Straße – Baroque relief
- Zeller Straße – wayside chapel, plastered building, 18th century, inside, sculpture of an order's saint, 19th century
- Zeller Straße 11 – plastered building, two corner pavilions, 1920s
- Zeller Straße 193 – plastered building, Swiss chalet style, 1920s

==== Senhals ====
- Saint Mary Magdalene's Catholic Chapel (Kapelle St. Maria Magdalena) – small aisleless church, essentially possibly from the 13th century; grave cross fragment, marked 1598
- Fährstraße – cast-iron hand pump, fountain basin
- Fährstraße 8 – timber-frame house, partly solid, mansard roof, marked 1747; in the back quarrystone house, possibly from the 16th century
- Fährstraße 13 – Altes Fährhaus; timber-frame building, partly solid, mansard roof, marked 1780
