= Haserich =

- Municipality
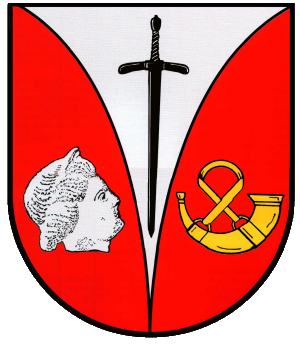
- Coat of arms

- Location of Haserich within Cochem-Zell district
- Interactive map of Haserich
- Location within Germany Location within Rhineland-Palatinate
- Coordinates: 50°2′12″N 7°19′32″E
- Country: Germany
- State: Rhineland-Palatinate
- District: Cochem-Zell
- Municipal assoc.: Zell (Mosel)

Government
  - Mayor (2019–24): Rudolf Wolfs

Area
  - Total: 4.45 km^{2} (1.72 sq mi)
- Elevation: 440 m (1,440 ft)

Population (2025-12-31)
  - Total: 218
  - Density: 49.0/km^{2} (127/sq mi)
- Time zone: UTC+01:00 (CET)
  - Summer (DST): UTC+02:00 (CEST)
- Postal codes: 56858
- Dialling codes: 06545
- Vehicle registration: COC
- Website: www.haserich.de

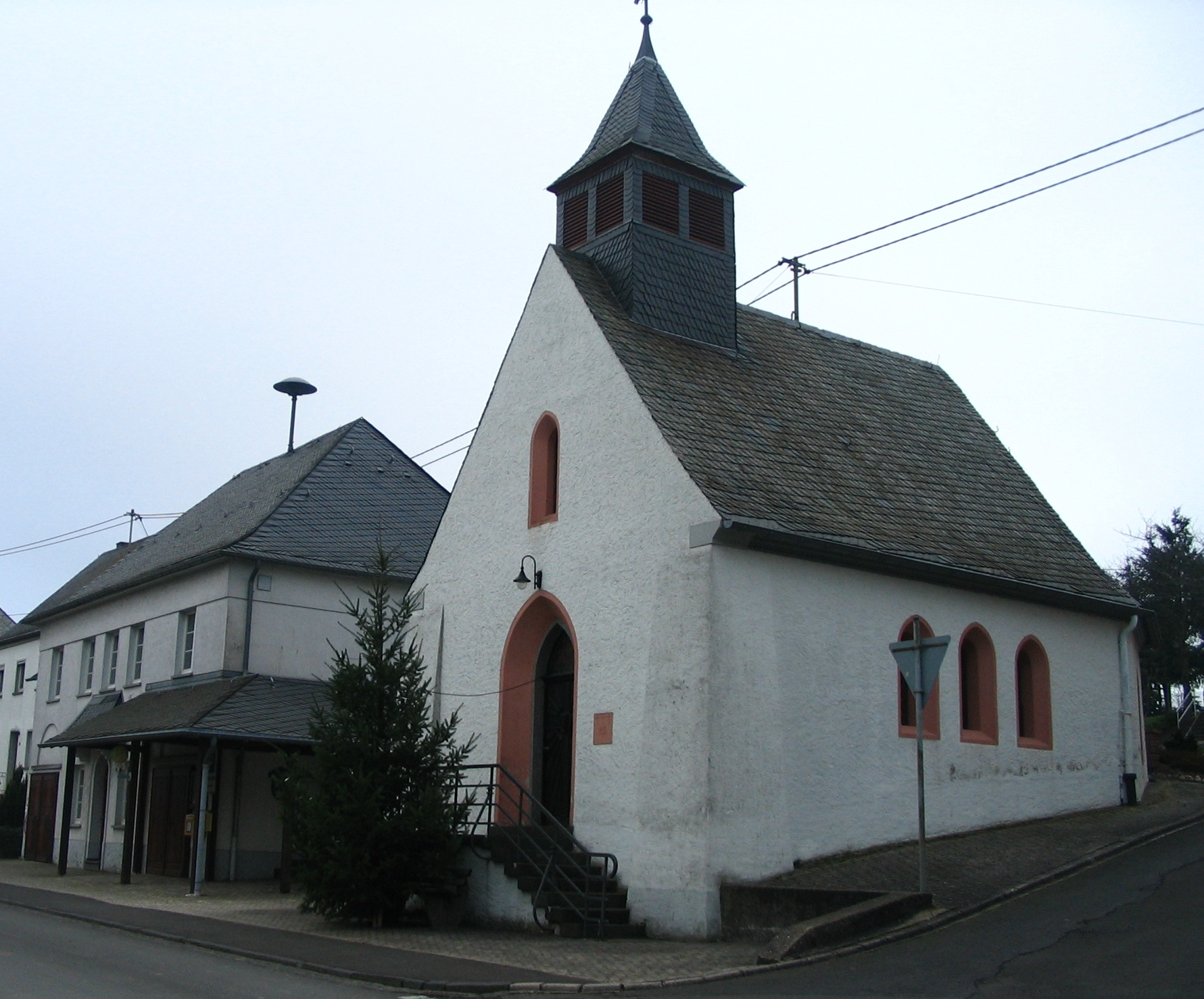
Community centre and chapel in central Haserich

Haserich is an Ortsgemeinde – a municipality belonging to a Verbandsgemeinde, a kind of collective municipality – in the Cochem-Zell district in Rhineland-Palatinate, Germany. It belongs to the Verbandsgemeinde of Zell, whose seat is in the municipality of Zell an der Mosel.

== Geography ==
The municipality lies in the Hunsrück in a sunken valley of the Flaumbach near Bundesstraße 421.

== History ==
In 1504, Haserich had its first documentary mention. On 20 January 1690, during the Nine Years' War (known in Germany as the Pfälzischer Erbfolgekrieg, or War of the Palatine Succession), Haserich was plundered by French troops, and partly burnt. The Counts of Sponheim held the court jurisdiction in the Hasericher Pflege (roughly "Haserich fostering") until 1788. Beginning in 1794, Haserich lay under French rule. In 1815 it was assigned to the Kingdom of Prussia at the Congress of Vienna. Since 1946, it has been part of the then newly founded state of Rhineland-Palatinate. Under the Verwaltungsvereinfachungsgesetz ("Administration Simplification Law") of 18 July 1970, with effect from 7 November 1970, the municipality was grouped into the Verbandsgemeinde of Zell.

== Politics ==
=== Municipal council ===
The council is made up of 6 council members, who were elected by majority vote at the municipal election held on 7 June 2009, and the honorary mayor as chairman.

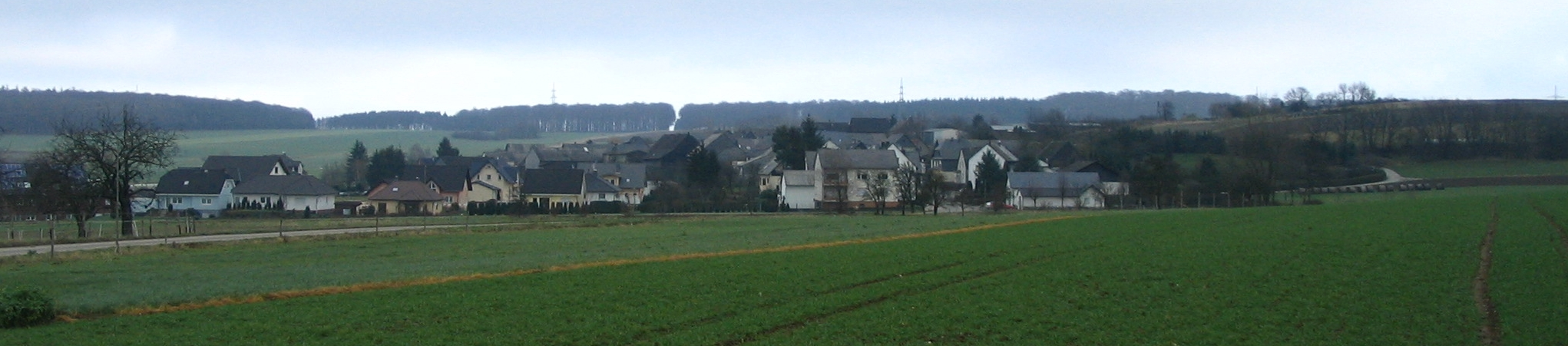
View from the west

== Culture and sightseeing ==
=== Buildings ===
The following are listed buildings or sites in Rhineland-Palatinate’s Directory of Cultural Monuments:

- Saint Michael's Chapel (Kapelle St. Michael) – aisleless church, 1932
- Hauptstraße 7 – Quereinhaus (a combination residential and commercial house divided for these two purposes down the middle, perpendicularly to the street); timber-frame building, partly solid, 17th or 18th century, bears year 1784 (renovation)
