= Cochem-Zell =

Coordinates: 50°10′N 7°10′E

- District
- Flag Coat of arms
- Country: Germany
- State: Rhineland-Palatinate
- Capital: Cochem

Government
  - District admin.: Anke Beilstein (CDU)

Area
  - Total: 691.82 km^{2} (267.11 sq mi)

Population (31 December 2023)
  - Total: 62,669
  - Density: 90.586/km^{2} (234.62/sq mi)
- Time zone: UTC+01:00 (CET)
  - Summer (DST): UTC+02:00 (CEST)
- Vehicle registration: COC, ZEL
- Website: cochem-zell.de

Cochem-Zell (German: Landkreis Cochem-Zell) is a district (Kreis) in the north-west of Rhineland-Palatinate, Germany. Neighboring districts are Mayen-Koblenz, Rhein-Hunsrück, Bernkastel-Wittlich, and Vulkaneifel.

== History ==
In 1816 the districts Cochem and Zell were created, after the area went to Prussia. In 1969 the Zell district was dissolved and its northern and middle parts were added to the Cochem district, which was renamed Cochem-Zell. In 2014 the municipalities Lahr, Mörsdorf and Zilshausen were assigned to the Rhein-Hunsrück-Kreis.

== Geography ==
The district consists of three different landscapes. The Moselle valley with its vineyards, and the mountains of the Hunsrück in the east and the Eifel in the north and west. The highest elevation is the Höchstberg at 616 m above sea level, located in the Eifel.

== Coat of arms ==
The German blazon reads: Schräglinks geteilt: vorne in Silber ein durchgehendes rotes Kreuz, belegt mit einem silbernem Hifthorn mit goldenem Riemen; hinten in Schwarz ein wachsender, rot bewehrter, gezungter und gekrönter goldener Löwe.

This might in English heraldic language be rendered thus: Per bend sinister argent a cross gules surmounted by a bugle-horn of the first, the bell to sinister, stringed Or, and sable issuant from base a lion rampant, his dexter paw couped at the line of partition, of the third armed, langued and crowned of the second.

The upper part of the coat of arms shows the main charge of the coat of arms of the Zell district, the cross of Trier, as the Bishops of Trier had a castle at Zell. The horn stands for the territory of Beilstein. The lion in the bottom is the symbol of the Electorate of the Palatinate; the Counts Palatine had a castle at Cochem.

== Towns and municipalities ==
Clickable map of towns and municipalities in the district

Verbandsgemeinden
1. Cochem; 1. Beilstein; 2. Bremm; 3. Briedern; 4. Bruttig-Fankel; 5. Cochem^{1, 2}; 6. Dohr; 7. Ediger-Eller; 8. Ellenz-Poltersdorf; 9. Ernst; 10. Faid; 11. Greimersburg; 12. Klotten; 13. Lieg; 14. Lütz; 15. Mesenich; 16. Moselkern; 17. Müden (Mosel); 18. Nehren; 19. Pommern; 20. Senheim; 21. Treis-Karden; 22. Valwig; 23. Wirfus	2. Kaisersesch; 1. Binningen; 2. Brachtendorf; 3. Brieden; 4. Brohl; 5. Dünfus; 6. Düngenheim; 7. Eppenberg; 8. Eulgem; 9. Forst (Eifel); 10. Gamlen; 11. Hambuch; 12. Hauroth; 13. Illerich; 14. Kaifenheim; 15. Kail; 16. Kaisersesch^{1, 2}; 17. Kalenborn; 18. Landkern; 19. Laubach; 20. Leienkaul; 21. Masburg; 22. Möntenich; 23. Müllenbach; 24. Roes; 25. Urmersbach; 26. Zettingen	3. Ulmen; 1. Alflen; 2. Auderath; 3. Bad Bertrich; 4. Beuren; 5. Büchel; 6. Filz; 7. Gevenich; 8. Gillenbeuren; 9. Kliding; 10. Lutzerath; 11. Schmitt; 12. Ulmen^{1, 2}; 13. Urschmitt; 14. Wagenhausen; 15. Weiler; 16. Wollmerath	4. Zell; 1. Alf; 2. Altlay; 3. Altstrimmig; 4. Blankenrath; 5. Briedel; 6. Bullay; 7. Forst (Hunsrück); 8. Grenderich; 9. Haserich; 10. Hesweiler; 11. Liesenich; 12. Mittelstrimmig; 13. Moritzheim; 14. Neef; 15. Panzweiler; 16. Peterswald-Löffelscheid; 17. Pünderich; 18. Reidenhausen; 19. Sankt Aldegund; 20. Schauren; 21. Sosberg; 22. Tellig; 23. Walhausen; 24. Zell (Mosel)^{1, 2}
^{1}seat of the Verbandsgemeinde; ^{2}town
