= Moritzheim =

- Municipality
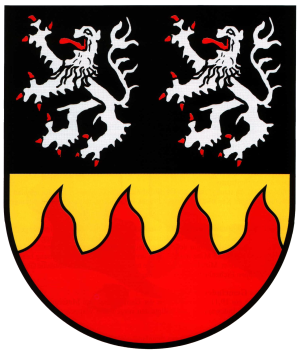
- Coat of arms

- Location of Moritzheim within Cochem-Zell district
- Interactive map of Moritzheim
- Location within Germany Location within Rhineland-Palatinate
- Coordinates: 50°2′53″N 7°15′44″E
- Country: Germany
- State: Rhineland-Palatinate
- District: Cochem-Zell
- Municipal assoc.: Zell (Mosel)

Government
  - Mayor (2019–24): Adelbert Reis

Area
  - Total: 4.02 km^{2} (1.55 sq mi)
- Elevation: 415 m (1,362 ft)

Population (2025-12-31)
  - Total: 124
  - Density: 30.8/km^{2} (79.9/sq mi)
- Time zone: UTC+01:00 (CET)
  - Summer (DST): UTC+02:00 (CEST)
- Postal codes: 56865
- Dialling codes: 06545
- Vehicle registration: COC

Moritzheim is an Ortsgemeinde – a municipality belonging to a Verbandsgemeinde, a kind of collective municipality – in the Cochem-Zell district in Rhineland-Palatinate, Germany. It belongs to the Verbandsgemeinde of Zell, whose seat is in the municipality of Zell an der Mosel.

== Geography ==
The municipality lies in the Hunsrück at an elevation of some 500 m above sea level. The river Moselle lies roughly 12 km away.

== History ==
After a great fire in Senheim on 13 August 1839, thirty families who had been left homeless founded the Kolonie Hoch-Senheim (hoch means “high” in German). The new village was given a new name soon after building work was finished. It was named after the Prussian Landrat (roughly, “district chairman”), Moritz.

Soon thereafter came lean years, and between 1846 and 1852, 23 families from the municipality emigrated to the United States for a better life, leaving only five people living in Moritzheim.

Since 1946, it has been part of the then newly founded state of Rhineland-Palatinate. Under the Verwaltungsvereinfachungsgesetz (“Administration Simplification Law”) of 28 July 1970, with effect from 7 November 1970, the municipality was grouped into the Verbandsgemeinde of Zell.

== Politics ==
=== Municipal council ===
The council is made up of 6 council members, who were elected by majority vote at the municipal election held on 7 June 2009, and the honorary mayor as chairman.

=== Mayor ===
Moritzheim's mayor is Adelbert Reis, and his deputies are Dieter Schug and Alfred Kaspari.

=== Coat of arms ===
The municipality's arms might be described thus: Per fess sable two lions rampant argent armed and langued gules and Or in base gules emerging from which four flames of the same.

== Economy and infrastructure ==
=== Public institutions ===
- Volunteer fire brigade
