= Zell (Verbandsgemeinde) =

Municipality in Rhineland-Palatinate, Germany

Zell (Mosel)
- Verbandsgemeinde
- Location of Zell (Mosel) within Cochem-Zell district
- Interactive map of Zell (Mosel)
- Location within Germany Location within Rhineland-Palatinate
- Coordinates: 50°02′N 7°11′E
- Country: Germany
- State: Rhineland-Palatinate
- District: Cochem-Zell
- Seat: Zell (Mosel)
- Subdivisions: 24 municipalities

Area
  - Total: 193.74 km^{2} (74.80 sq mi)

Population (2025-12-31)
  - Total: 15,382
  - Density: 79.395/km^{2} (205.63/sq mi)
- Time zone: UTC+01:00 (CET)
  - Summer (DST): UTC+02:00 (CEST)
- Website: www.zell-mosel.de

Zell (Mosel) is a Verbandsgemeinde ("collective municipality") in the district Cochem-Zell, in Rhineland-Palatinate, Germany. The seat of the Verbandsgemeinde is in Zell.

The Verbandsgemeinde Zell (Mosel) consists of the following Ortsgemeinden ("local municipalities"):

1. Alf
2. Altlay
3. Altstrimmig
4. Blankenrath
5. Briedel
6. Bullay
7. Forst (Hunsrück)
8. Grenderich
9. Haserich
10. Hesweiler
11. Liesenich
12. Mittelstrimmig
13. Moritzheim
14. Neef
15. Panzweiler
16. Peterswald-Löffelscheid
17. Pünderich
18. Reidenhausen
19. Sankt Aldegund
20. Schauren
21. Sosberg
22. Tellig
23. Walhausen
24. Zell (Mosel)
