= Sosberg =

- Municipality
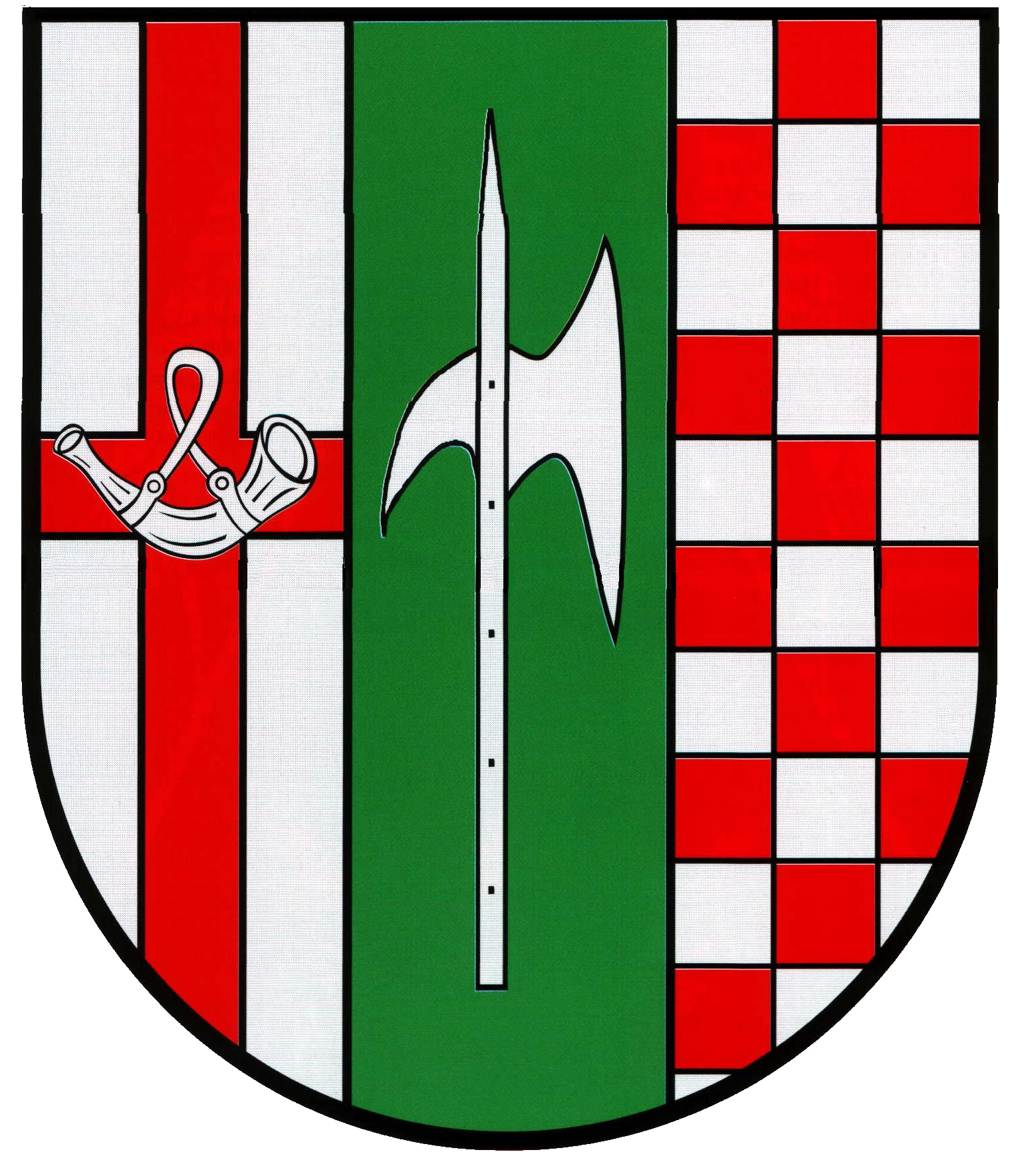
- Coat of arms

- Location of Sosberg within Cochem-Zell district
- Interactive map of Sosberg
- Location within Germany Location within Rhineland-Palatinate
- Coordinates: 50°4′40″N 7°20′19″E
- Country: Germany
- State: Rhineland-Palatinate
- District: Cochem-Zell
- Municipal assoc.: Zell (Mosel)

Government
  - Mayor (2019–24): Andreas Lehnert

Area
  - Total: 3.91 km^{2} (1.51 sq mi)
- Elevation: 370 m (1,210 ft)

Population (2025-12-31)
  - Total: 145
  - Density: 37.1/km^{2} (96.0/sq mi)
- Time zone: UTC+01:00 (CET)
  - Summer (DST): UTC+02:00 (CEST)
- Postal codes: 56858
- Dialling codes: 06545
- Vehicle registration: COC
- Website: www.sosberg.de

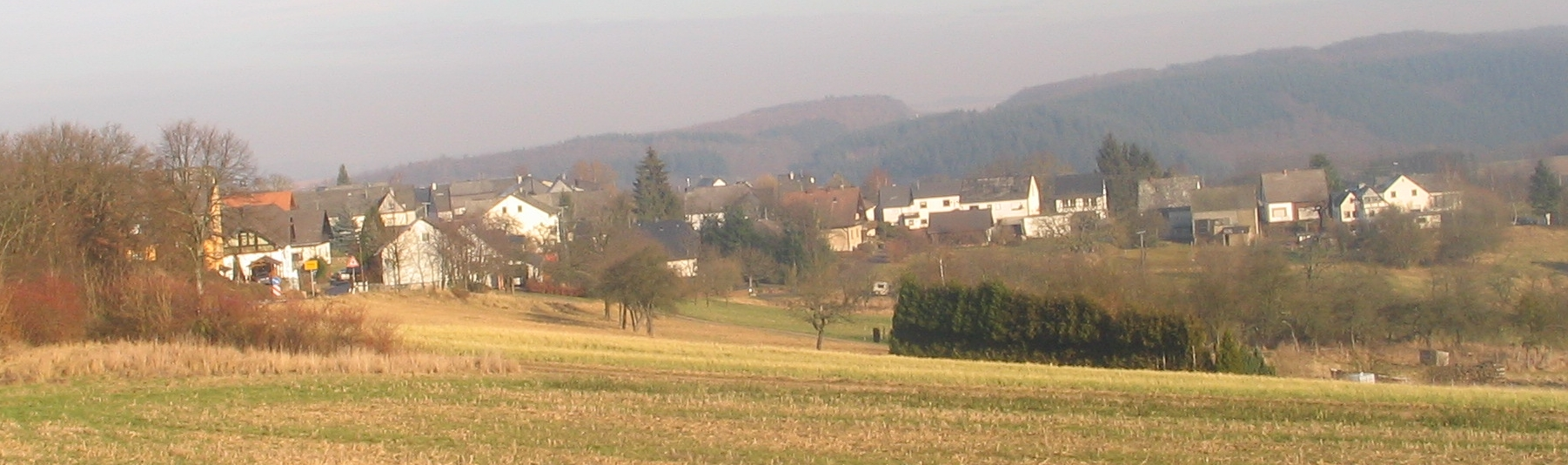
Sosberg seen from the west

Sosberg is an Ortsgemeinde – a municipality belonging to a Verbandsgemeinde, a kind of collective municipality – in the Cochem-Zell district in Rhineland-Palatinate, Germany. It belongs to the Verbandsgemeinde of Zell, whose seat is in the municipality of Zell an der Mosel.

== Geography ==
The municipality lies on a sloped edge in the Hunsrück between the rivers Moselle, Nahe and Rhine on the one hand and the Idarwald and Soonwald (wooded areas of the Hunsrück) on the other. East of the village runs the Mörsdorfer Bach towards the Moselle.

== History ==
In 1330, Sosberg had its first documentary mention under the name Soysbergh.

The village was until 1781 part of the “Three-Lord Territory”. As in the Beltheim court, the landlordship was shared among the Electorate of Trier, the County of Sponheim and the House of Braunshorn (later Winneburg and Metternich). Beginning in 1794, Sosberg lay under French rule. In 1815 it was assigned to the Kingdom of Prussia at the Congress of Vienna. Since 1946, it has been part of the then newly founded state of Rhineland-Palatinate. Under the Verwaltungsvereinfachungsgesetz (“Administration Simplification Law”) of 18 July 1970, with effect from 7 November 1970, the municipality was grouped into the Verbandsgemeinde of Zell.

== Politics ==
=== Municipal council ===
The council is made up of 6 council members, who were elected by majority vote at the municipal election held on 7 June 2009, and the honorary mayor as chairman.

=== Mayor ===
Sosberg's mayor is Andreas Lehnert.

=== Coat of arms ===
The German blazon reads: Der Wappenschild ist zweimal gespalten. Vorn in Silber ein rotes, durchgehendes Kreuz, belegt mit einem silbernen Hifthorn. Das Mittelfeld zeigt in Grün eine linkshin gerichtete, silberne Hellebarde, hinten ein silbern-rotes Schach zu drei Plätzen in elf Reihen.

The municipality's arms might in English heraldic language be described thus: A pale vert charged with a pole-axe argent, the edge to sinister, between argent a cross gules surmounted by a bugle-horn of the second, the bell to sinister, and chequy of thirty-three of the second and third.

The red cross on the dexter (armsbearer's right, viewer's left) side refers to the Electorate of Trier and the horn stands for the Imperial lordship of Beilstein. The axe is Saint Matthias’s attribute, thus representing the church’s patron saint. The green field tincture on which this charge appears refers to the municipality’s agricultural structure. The silver and red “chequy” pattern on the sinister (armsbearer's left, viewer's right) side is from the arms formerly borne by the “Hinder” County of Sponheim.

The arms have been borne since 26 October 1971.

== Culture and sightseeing ==
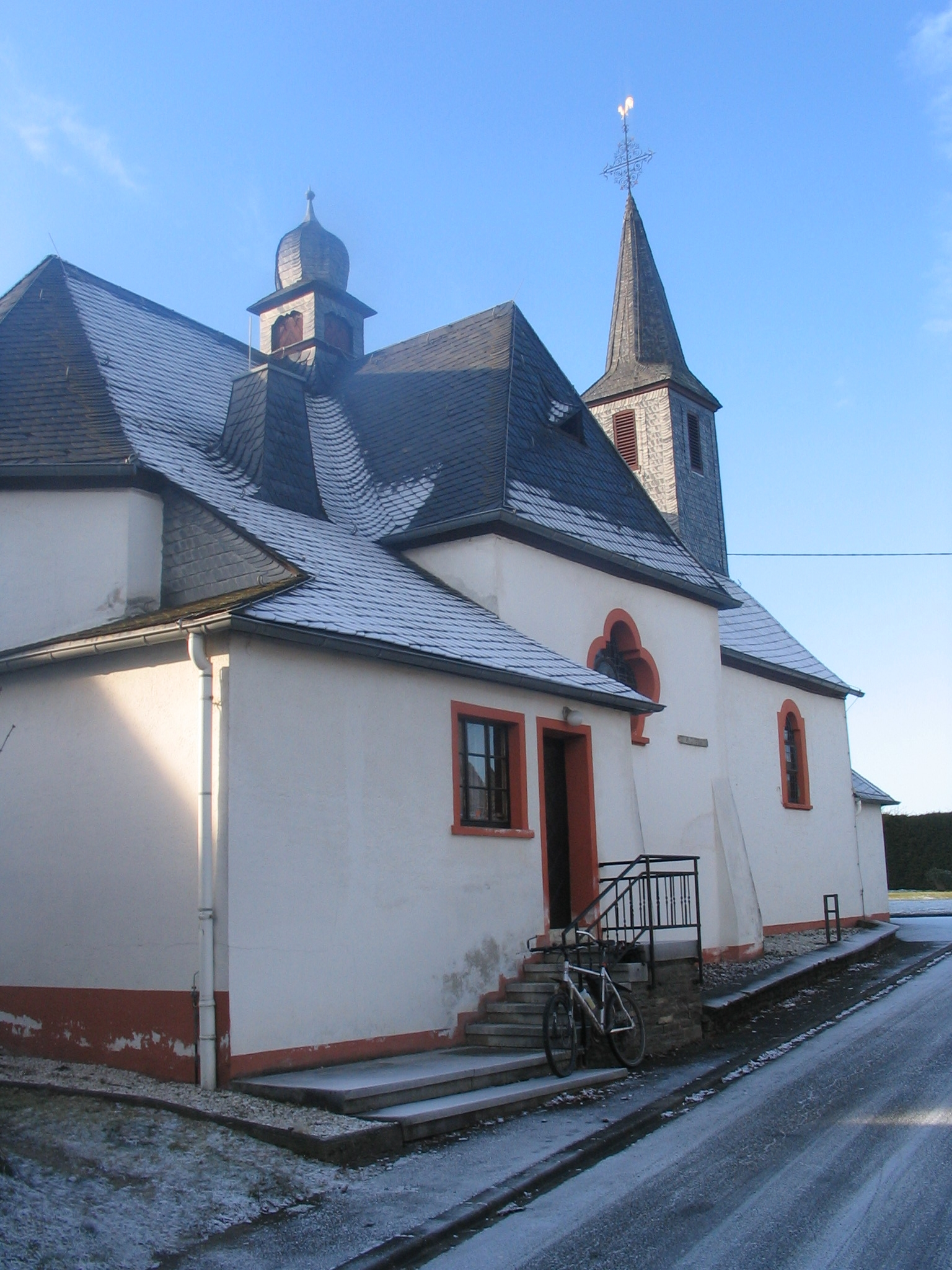
An der Kirche: Saint Matthias's Catholic Church

=== Buildings ===
The following are listed buildings or sites in Rhineland-Palatinate’s Directory of Cultural Monuments:

- Saint Matthias’s Catholic Church (branch church; Filialkirche St. Matthias), An der Kirche – aisleless church with transept, marked 1769, expansion 1926, vestibule 1947
- Hauptstraße 13 – Quereinhaus (a combination residential and commercial house divided for these two purposes down the middle, perpendicularly to the street); timber-frame building, partly solid, 19th century; barn
- Hauptstraße 14 – Quereinhaus; timber-frame building, partly solid or slated, 18th or 19th century
- Kirchweg 8 – cast-iron cross, Rheinböllen foundry, late 19th century
- Mastershausener Weg 1 – Quereinhaus; timber-frame building, partly slated, marked 1889
- Steilweg 1 – timber-frame house, 19th century
- Steilweg 3 – Quereinhaus; timber-frame building, partly solid, 19th century

=== Regular events ===
- Traditional shooting festival held by the Schützenverein Sosberg (marksmen's club)
