= Tellig =

- Municipality
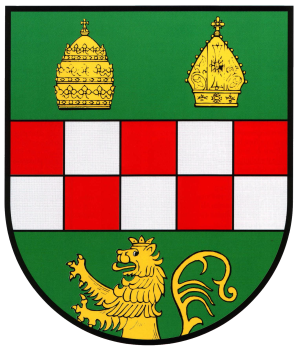
- Coat of arms

- Location of Tellig within Cochem-Zell district
- Interactive map of Tellig
- Location within Germany Location within Rhineland-Palatinate
- Coordinates: 50°1′31.97″N 7°15′11.24″E
- Country: Germany
- State: Rhineland-Palatinate
- District: Cochem-Zell
- Municipal assoc.: Zell (Mosel)

Government
  - Mayor (2019–24): Sabine Liesegang-Zirwes

Area
  - Total: 1.21 km^{2} (0.47 sq mi)
- Elevation: 445 m (1,460 ft)

Population (2025-12-31)
  - Total: 310
  - Density: 260/km^{2} (660/sq mi)
- Time zone: UTC+01:00 (CET)
  - Summer (DST): UTC+02:00 (CEST)
- Postal codes: 56858
- Dialling codes: 06545
- Vehicle registration: COC

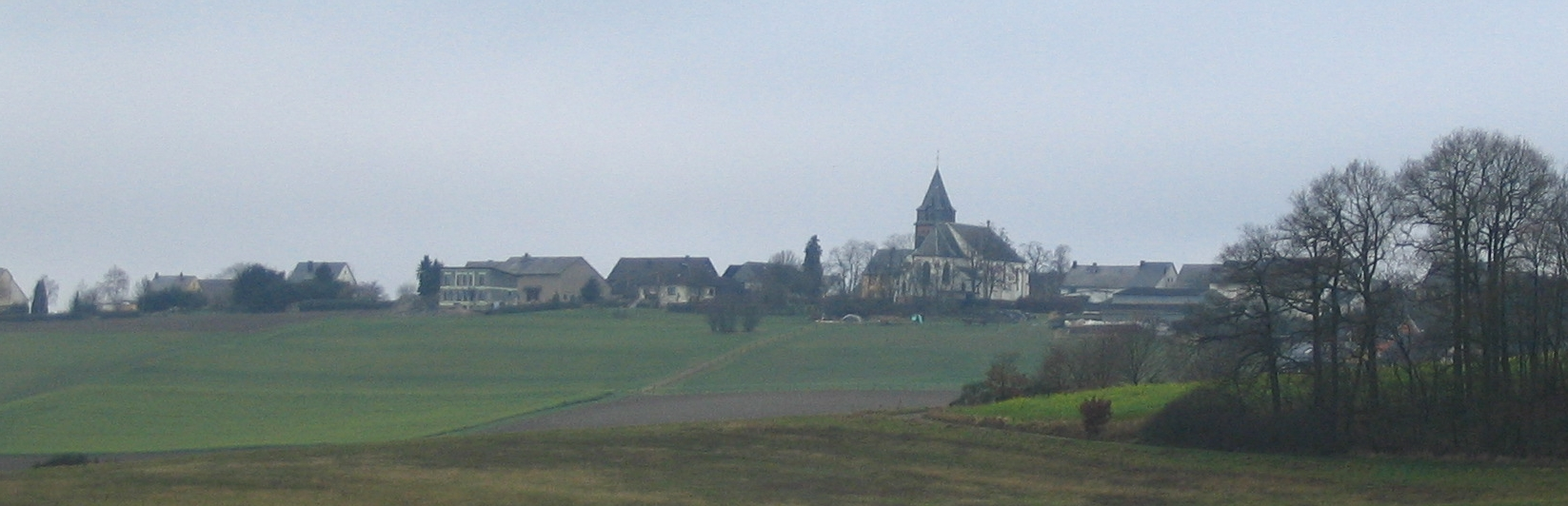
Tellig seen from the south

Tellig is an Ortsgemeinde – a municipality belonging to a Verbandsgemeinde, a kind of collective municipality – in the Cochem-Zell district in Rhineland-Palatinate, Germany. It belongs to the Verbandsgemeinde of Zell, whose seat is in the municipality of Zell an der Mosel.

== Geography ==
The municipality lies in the northern Hunsrück some 5 km from the river Moselle, near Bundesstraße 421.

== History ==
In 1275, Tellig had its first documentary mention as Tellich. Beginning in 1794, Tellig lay under French rule. In 1815 it was assigned to the Kingdom of Prussia at the Congress of Vienna. At the Theodor bei Tellig mine in the early 20th century, lead and zinc ore deposits were worked. The settlement of Althaus near Tellig was built in 1937 by the Reichsarbeitsdienst (RAD). Since 1946, Tellig has been part of the then newly founded state of Rhineland-Palatinate. Under the Verwaltungsvereinfachungsgesetz (“Administration Simplification Law”) of 18 July 1970, with effect from 7 November 1970, the municipality was grouped into the Verbandsgemeinde of Zell.

== Politics ==
=== Municipal council ===
The council is made up of 6 council members, who were elected by majority vote at the municipal election held on 7 June 2009, and the honorary mayor as chairwoman.

=== Mayor ===
Tellig's mayor is Sabine Liesegang-Zirwes, and her deputies are Christof Daubner and Ralf Dillenburger.

=== Coat of arms ===
The municipality's arms might be described thus: Vert a fess countercompony of ten gules and argent between, in chief, a Papal Tiara and a mitre ensigned with a cross in fess, and issuant from base a lion rampant crowned, all Or.

== Culture and sightseeing ==
=== Buildings ===
The following are listed buildings or sites in Rhineland-Palatinate’s Directory of Cultural Monuments:

- Saint Cornelius's and Saint Cyprian's Catholic Church (Kirche St. Cornelius und Cyprianus), Hauptstraße 16 – three-naved Gothic Revival hall church, 1862–1865, architect Vincenz Statz, Cologne; campanile, 1933; whole complex with rectory and barn
- Hauptstraße – basalt fountain, marked 1720
- At Hauptstraße 16 – parish barn; plastered building with tracery windows, 15th century, timber-frame knee wall, portal marked 1706; whole complex with church and rectory
- Hauptstraße 17 – former rectory; plastered building, mid 19th century; whole complex with church and barn

== Economy and infrastructure ==
=== Transport ===
Tellig lies south of Bundesstraße 421 over which the town of Zell, lying some 10 km away, and Bullay (DB) railway station on the Koblenz-Trier railway line, 15 km away, can be reached.
