= Briedel =

- Municipality
- Coat of arms

- Location of Briedel within Cochem-Zell district
- Interactive map of Briedel
- Location within Germany Location within Rhineland-Palatinate
- Coordinates: 50°1′26.55″N 7°8′56.72″E
- Country: Germany
- State: Rhineland-Palatinate
- District: Cochem-Zell
- Municipal assoc.: Zell (Mosel)

Government
  - Mayor (2019–24): Thomas Steinbach

Area
  - Total: 26.61 km^{2} (10.27 sq mi)
- Elevation: 118 m (387 ft)

Population (2025-12-31)
  - Total: 841
  - Density: 31.6/km^{2} (81.9/sq mi)
- Time zone: UTC+01:00 (CET)
  - Summer (DST): UTC+02:00 (CEST)
- Postal codes: 56867
- Dialling codes: 06542
- Vehicle registration: COC
- Website: www.briedel.de

Briedel is an Ortsgemeinde – a municipality belonging to a Verbandsgemeinde, a kind of collective municipality – in the Cochem-Zell district in Rhineland-Palatinate, Germany. It belongs to the Verbandsgemeinde of Zell, whose seat is in the municipality of Zell an der Mosel. Briedel is an old winegrowing centre on the Middle Moselle.

== Geography ==
=== Location ===
The municipality lies on the river Moselle's right bank at the mouth of the Briedeler Bach, which rises in the Hunsrück. Briedel is in the middle of the Briedeler Schweiz ("Briedel Switzerland"), a nature conservation area comprising a woodland area with craggy outcrops, impressive lookout points and well marked hiking trails. To Bernkastel-Kues it is some 42 km, and to Cochem, roughly 41 km.

=== Constituent communities ===
Belonging to the Ortsgemeinde are the centres of Maiermund, Briedeler Heck, Bummkopf and Hohestein, as well as the formerly state-owned domain of Margaretenhof.

== History ==
=== Prehistory to AD 500 ===
Digs undertaken in 1870 on the Briedeler Heck showed that the area was settled as early as the New Stone Age. Other digs in 1936-1937 and 1953-1954 unearthed great burying grounds which were rich in grave goods. This established that settlers were here from late Hallstatt times to the end of Roman times, thus over more than a thousand years. In 293, Constantius Chlorus, the Roman proconsul in Trier, apparently took some wine from Briedel with him back to Rome that Emperor Diocletian supposedly greatly enjoyed. About 475, Briedel and the Moselle province passed unequivocally into the Franks’ hands. The Romance-speaking and Romanized inhabitants remained in great numbers along the Moselle valley, living alongside the Frankish conquerors, some in their own settlements, and some in the same settlements as the Franks. The two peoples melded together only gradually. Until the High Middle Ages, the inhabitants had their own "Germano-Romance" language. Linguists assume that Germanization was completed only in the 12th century.

=== Middle Ages: 500 to 1400 ===
About 600, the first church was established with Saint Martin as its patron saint. The first documentary mention came some 150 years later on 20 May 748 when Bishop Chrodegang of Metz, with the later Carolingian King (751–768) but meanwhile Mayor of the Palace Pepin's consent, donated to the newly founded Gorze Abbey near Metz, among many other holdings, the wine tithes at Briedel, which was named in this document as Bredaculo. This also makes the document one of the oldest pieces of evidence for winegrowing in the Moselle valley. On 17 February 893 Bishop Rodbert of Metz furnished the Collegiate Foundation of Neumünster with a wine benefit from the estates now known as villa bredallio. This tithe was reconfirmed in 936, 944 and 1138.

Many further references confirm a church and the names Bredal, Bridal and Bridell as well as various estate and vineyard holders. On 5 February 1264, the St. Trond Benedictine Abbey sold its holdings in Briedel to Himmerod Abbey along with the tithes and patronage rights to the parish church at Briedel for 1,150 marks sterling. With this acquisition, Himmerod Abbey's hold on Briedel became quite fast and the village's fate was in the Abbey's hands for more than 500 years. In 1343, Briedel had a girding wall with a tower (the Eulenturm, or "Owl’s Tower") and four gates. On 31 May 1376 it was granted town rights, making Briedel a firm component of the Trier Electoral State. The townsmen celebrated the attendant end of serfdom, although they quickly realized that this would not change their lives in any way. Drudgery, tithes and servitude were as much life's everyday realities as they always had been. The Briedel court was made up of the Schultheiß and seven Schöffen (roughly "lay jurists"). In 1377, Briedel became part of the Amt of Zell.

=== 1400 to 1700 ===
In 1518, Briedel acquired its own court seal, which later provided the model for the municipal coat of arms borne today. In 1595, the village, which was said to be well off, was attacked by bands of mercenaries led by Captain Langhans at the time of the church consecration festival. The Briedel villagers, supported by their neighbours, scattered them and sent them home with "bloody heads". In 1632 and 1635, Swedish troops plundered Briedel and killed some of the inhabitants; the survivors were then reduced in number by a third with the coming of the Plague in 1636. The already concluded Peace of Westphalia, which was supposed to have ended the Thirty Years' War, did not spare the village further plundering by French troops, who sacked the church and set the village ablaze.

In 1674, Briedel, and also some of the neighbouring places, denied French occupational troops in Trier any contributions. In an act of revenge, the troops set out from Trier to punish the wayward villages, but on the way met with Imperial troops who beat them back. The village's fortifications were destroyed by the French in 1689. The villagers then had to do compulsory labour, building the fort, Mont Royal.

=== 1700 to 1900 ===
In 1719, the municipal area and vineyard ownership were newly surveyed. It was determined that 15.5% belonged in ecclesiastical ownership, 39.7% in knightly ownership, 9.7% in other noblemen's hands and in private ownership a mere 28.6%. From 1772 to 1774, Saint Martin's Church, the one that still stands now, was built, and in 1780 an organ was built in. In 1784, Briedel had 732 inhabitants, namely 144 fathers, 160 mothers, 210 sons, 197 daughters, 6 menservants and 15 maidservants. Moreover, the village had 142 buildings with a worth of 37,900 Reichstaler.

Beginning in 1794, Briedel lay under French rule. In 1815 it was assigned to the Kingdom of Prussia at the Congress of Vienna.

=== 1900 to present ===
From 1902 to 1905, the Moselle Valley Railway (Moseltalbahn) was built, known in the local speech as the Saufbähnchen ("Little Guzzling Railway"). In 1939, 1,887 people lived in Briedel.

Since 1946, Briedel has been part of the then newly founded state of Rhineland-Palatinate. The Maiermund housing development sprang up on cleared swathes of the Briedeler Hecke after the Second World War in the course of the housing development movement. In 1969, administrative restructuring in Rhineland-Palatinate put Briedel in the new Cochem-Zell district.

In 1991, a lady from Briedel named Bettina Fischer became the Mosel-Saar-Ruwer Regional "Wine Queen"; the following year she also became "German Wine Princess".

== Politics ==
=== Municipal council ===
The council is made up of 16 council members, who were elected by proportional representation at the municipal election held on 7 June 2009, and the honorary mayor as chairman.

The municipal election held on 7 June 2009 yielded the following results:

Year	CDU	FWG	Total
2009	6	10	16 seats
2004	6	10	16 seats

=== Mayor ===
Briedel's mayor is Thomas Steinbach.

=== Coat of arms ===
The German blazon reads: In Silber ein rotes Kreuz, bewinkelt im ersten und vierten Felde von grünen Rankenornamenten, im zweiten durch die Buchstaben BR und im dritten Feld eine grüne Weintraube.

The municipality's arms might in English heraldic language be described thus: Argent a cross gules, in dexter chief and sinister base tendril patterns, in sinister chief the letters BR, and in dexter base a bunch of grapes on a vine palewise reversed, leafed of two and slipped, all vert.

The old 1518 seal used by the court of Schöffen (roughly "lay jurists") served as the model for today's coat of arms. The cross refers to the former landholder, the Prince-Archbishop-Elector of Trier. "BR" simply stands for the first two letters in the municipality's name. The grapevine and the grapes refer to the municipality as one of the oldest winegrowing centres in the Moselle valley, and the winegrowing itself, which is still a part of local life today.

The arms have been borne since 1 February 1957, and they were designed by Dr. Bruno Hirschfeld of Koblenz, after the old seal.

== Culture and sightseeing ==
=== Buildings ===
There are many timber-frame houses, a Baroque church with a Stumm organ and ceiling paintings, and a fountain in the village centre. Nearby is the wooded area Briedeler Schweiz ("Briedel Switzerland").

The following are listed buildings or sites in Rhineland-Palatinate’s Directory of Cultural Monuments:

- Saint Martin’s Catholic Church (Kirche St. Martin) with graveyard, Römerstraße – Baroque aisleless church, bears years 1773 and 1774; figure of Saint Martin, 1853, Sayn lodge; mission cross; cast-iron graveyard cross, 19th century; grave cross; grave tablet, 1814; whole complex with church and graveyard; down from the church a Heiligenhäuschen (a small, shrinelike structure consecrated to a saint or saints); relief.
- Eulenturm, or "Owl’s Tower" (monumental zone) – remnants of the village fortifications; part of the east wall and round tower, 1343 (?).
- Alte Rathausstraße 1 – timber-frame house, partly solid, balloon frame, 16th century.
- Alte Rathausstraße 2 – timber-frame house, partly solid, plastered, 18th or 19th century.
- Auf dem Bach 1 – timber-frame house, partly solid, plastered, mansard roof, late 18th or early 19th century.
- Auf dem Bach 2 – three-floor timber-frame house, partly solid, plastered and slated, essentially possibly from the 17th century.
- Auf dem Bach 3 – timber-frame house, partly solid, plastered, 18th or 19th century.
- Auf der Bach 4 – timber-frame house, partly solid, mansard roof, latter half of 18th century.
- Auf der Bach 5 – timber-frame house, partly solid, mansard roof, earlier half of 18th century; Nepomuk figure, 18th century.
- Balduinstraße 7 – quarrystone house, about 1860.
- Eltzerhofstraße 3 – timber-frame house, partly solid, earlier half of 18th century.
- Eltzerhofstraße 11, Moselstraße 36 – former Himmerod estate; plastered building, 17th century, whole complex, Moselstraße 35/36 – double house, half-hipped roof, about 1806.
- Graf-Salm-Straße 1 – three-floor timber-frame house, partly solid, plastered, 18th century, possibly older.
- Graf-Salm-Straße 3 – timber-frame house, partly solid, plastered, essentially from the 17th century.
- Graf-Salm-Straße 4 – timber-frame house, partly solid, plastered, apparently from the 17th, but more likely from the 18th century.
- Graf-Salm-Straße 5 – three-floor timber-frame house, partly solid, from 1593, timber framing from 1621, but more likely from the 18th century, half-hipped roof.
- Hauptstraße 72 – long plastered building, earlier half of 19th century.
- Hauptstraße 77 – timber-frame house, partly solid, early 18th century, essentially possibly older; whole complex with winepress house.
- Hauptstraße 79 – three-floor timber-frame house, partly solid, plastered, 18th century.
- Hauptstraße 81 – timber-frame house, partly solid, 19th century.
- Hauptstraße 85 – timber-frame house, partly solid, plastered, 17th or 18th century.
- Hauptstraße 87 – Late Historicist timber-frame house, partly solid, "Moselle-style", about 1900.
- Hauptstraße 88 – timber-frame house, partly solid, remnants of a Gothic door, dendrochronologically dated to 1585 ± 5 years, gable timber framing possibly from the late 17th century, left part of the house slated, possibly built on in the 17th century, half-hipped roof, upper floor bears year 1615.
- Hauptstraße 90 – Baroque plastered building, from 1767.
- Hauptstraße 91 – three-floor timber-frame house, partly solid, bears years 1621 and 1770.
- Hauptstraße 93 – building with half-hipped roof, timber framing (?), plastered, 19th century.
- Hauptstraße 96 – house; plastered building, 19th century.
- Hauptstraße 97 – quarrystone building, mansard roof, late 19th century, towards the back older building.
- Hauptstraße 103 – quarrystone building, half-hipped roof, late 19th century.
- Himmeroder Straße 8 – timber-frame house, partly solid, dendrochronologically dated to 1565, altered in the 17th century, timber-frame addition from the 18th century.
- Im Kordel 1 – timber-frame house, partly solid, mansard roof, 18th century.
- Im Kordel 6 – timber-frame house, partly solid, plastered, 18th century.
- Moselstraße 22 – timber-frame house, partly solid, hipped mansard roof, 18th century.
- Moselstrase 27 - Anker Hotel, late 17th century rebuilt post WW2, arched cellar foundations dated 1500.
- Moselstraße 28/29 – old ferry house; timber-frame house, partly solid, plastered and sided, 17th or 18th century.
- Moselstraße 31 – building with half-hipped roof, 19th century.
- Moselstraße 32 – quarrystone building, half-hipped roof, 19th century.
- Moselstraße 33 – former school; three-floor Classicist plastered building, earlier half of 19th century.
- Moselstraße 37 – plastered building, hipped mansard roof, from 1808.
- Römerstraße 1, Hauptstraße 89 – timber-frame house, partly solid, from 1524, upper floor from 17th century, addition in 19th century, timber-frame barn; whole complex.
- Römerstraße 2 – timber-frame house, partly solid, plastered, half-hipped roof, 17th century.
- Römerstraße 6/8 – timber-frame house, mansard roof, 18th century.
- Römerstraße 24 – timber-frame house, partly solid, half-hipped roof, 19th century.
- Römerstraße 29 – timber-frame house, plastered, 18th or 19th century.
- Springiersbacher Straße – boundary stone.
- Springiersbacherstraße 6 – timber-frame house, partly solid, 18th century, timber-frame barn; whole complex.
- Springiersbacherstraße 8/10 – timber-frame double house, partly solid, mansard roof, 18th century.
- Zehntstraße 1 – plastered timber-frame barn, apparently bears year 1595.
- Zehntstraße 2 – Late Historicist timber-frame house, partly solid, about 1900.
- Zehntstraße 3 – timber-frame house, partly solid, mansard roof, essentially from early or mid 17th century, conversion in 1763.
- Zehntstraße 4/6 – no. 4 timber-frame house, plastered, 16th century; no. 6 plastered building.
- Zehntstraße 5 – timber-frame house, partly solid, from 1586, altered in 17th, 18th and 19th centuries, timber-frame addition from the 18th century.
- Zehntstraße 12 – timber-frame house, partly solid, balloon frame, 16th century.
- Zehntstraße 14 – former town hall; three-floor timber-frame house, partly solid (arcade), from 1615; abutting Gothic façade-gable, timber-frame house.
- Maiermonder Hof; timber-frame house, mansard roof, from 1749, whole complex.
- Wegekapelle, plastered building, from 1823; cross, from 1791.
- Sündehaus, Kapelle, 19th century.
- Pilgrims’ way with stations, slate quarrystone stele, terra cotta reliefs, 19th century.

=== Regular events ===
Each year on the first weekend in August, the Großes Weinfest ("Great Wine Festival") is held. On the first weekend in September comes the Weinstraßenfest ("Wine Street Festival").

== Economy and infrastructure ==
Briedel is an old wine village. Its vineyard operators are Briedeler Herzchen, Nonnengarten, Schäferlay, Schelm and Weißerberg. The tourism resort has at its disposal hotels, inns and private pensions.
