= Walhausen =

- Municipality
- Coat of arms

- Location of Walhausen within Cochem-Zell district
- Interactive map of Walhausen
- Location within Germany Location within Rhineland-Palatinate
- Coordinates: 50°1′38″N 7°17′3″E
- Country: Germany
- State: Rhineland-Palatinate
- District: Cochem-Zell
- Municipal assoc.: Zell (Mosel)

Government
  - Mayor (2019–24): Klaus Hansen

Area
  - Total: 2.27 km^{2} (0.88 sq mi)
- Elevation: 440 m (1,440 ft)

Population (2025-12-31)
  - Total: 196
  - Density: 86.3/km^{2} (224/sq mi)
- Time zone: UTC+01:00 (CET)
  - Summer (DST): UTC+02:00 (CEST)
- Postal codes: 56865
- Dialling codes: 06545
- Vehicle registration: COC

Walhausen (German pronunciation: [ˈvalˌhaʊzn̩]) is an Ortsgemeinde – a municipality belonging to a Verbandsgemeinde, a kind of collective municipality – in the Cochem-Zell district in Rhineland-Palatinate, Germany. It belongs to the Verbandsgemeinde of Zell, whose seat is in the municipality of Zell an der Mosel.

== Geography ==
The municipality lies in the Hunsrück near Bundesstraße 421.

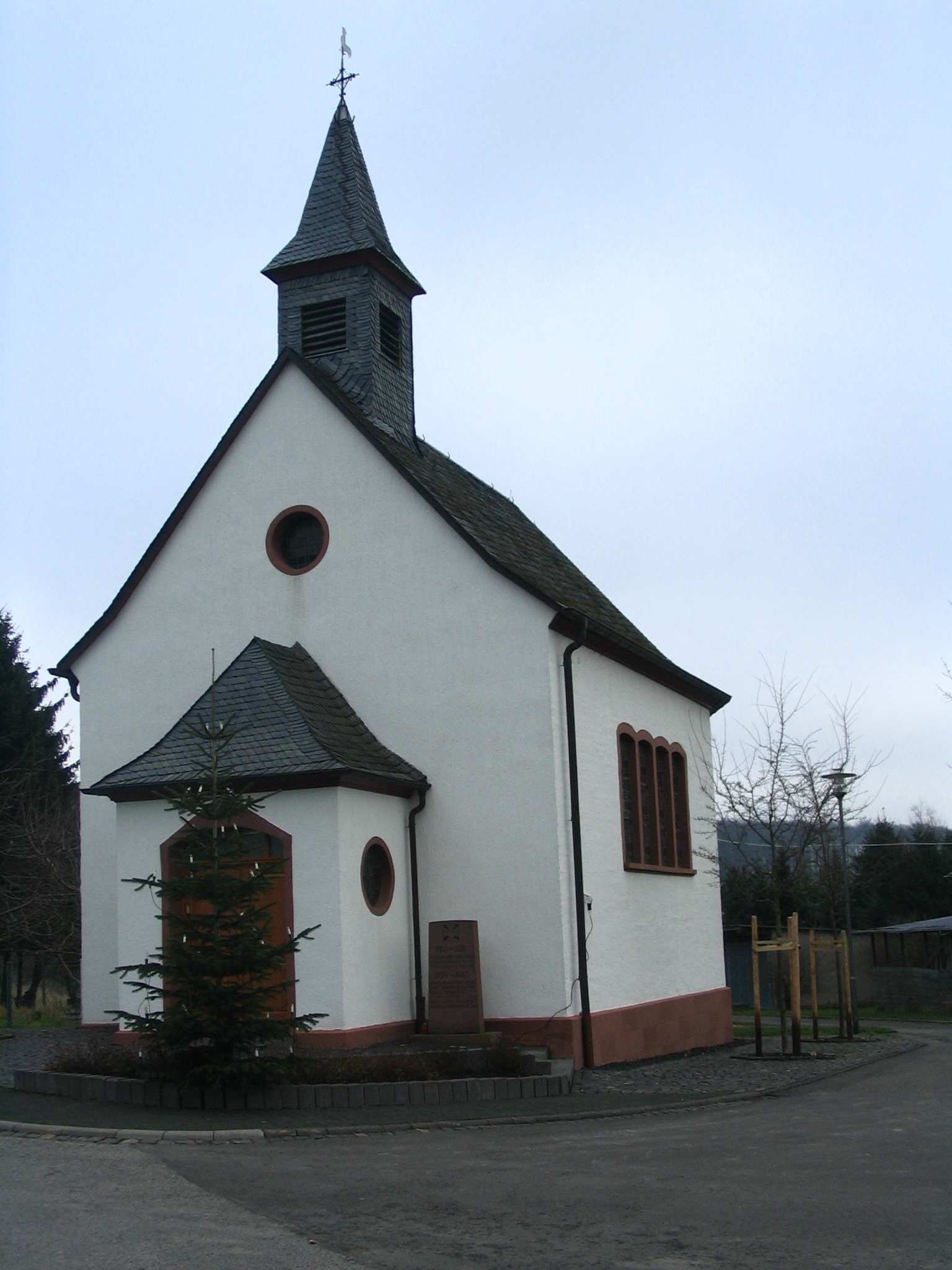
Walhausen Chapel

== History ==
In 1475, a holding was mentioned that lay in Waldenhuysen und Schuren and which was sold by Friedrich von Pyrmont to Friedrich Zandt von Merl. Beginning in 1794, Walhausen lay under French rule. In 1815 it was assigned to the Kingdom of Prussia at the Congress of Vienna. Until 1839, Walhausen and Schauren together formed a single municipality. The chapel that stood in the village centre was torn down in 1923/1924 and in 1932, a new church was built in Mary's honour. Since 1946, Walhausen has been part of the then newly founded state of Rhineland-Palatinate. Under the Verwaltungsvereinfachungsgesetz (“Administration Simplification Law”) of 18 July 1970, with effect from 7 November 1970, the municipality was grouped into the Verbandsgemeinde of Zell.

== Politics ==
=== Municipal council ===
The council is made up of 6 council members, who were elected by majority vote at the municipal election held on 7 June 2009, and the honorary mayor as chairman.

=== Mayor ===
Walhausen's mayor is Klaus Hansen.

=== Coat of arms ===
The municipality's arms might be described thus: Tierced in mantle reversed, dexter argent three bugle-horns in bend, the bells to sinister gules, in chief sable semée of crosses a bend dancetty Or, sinister argent three escallops in bend sinister of the third.

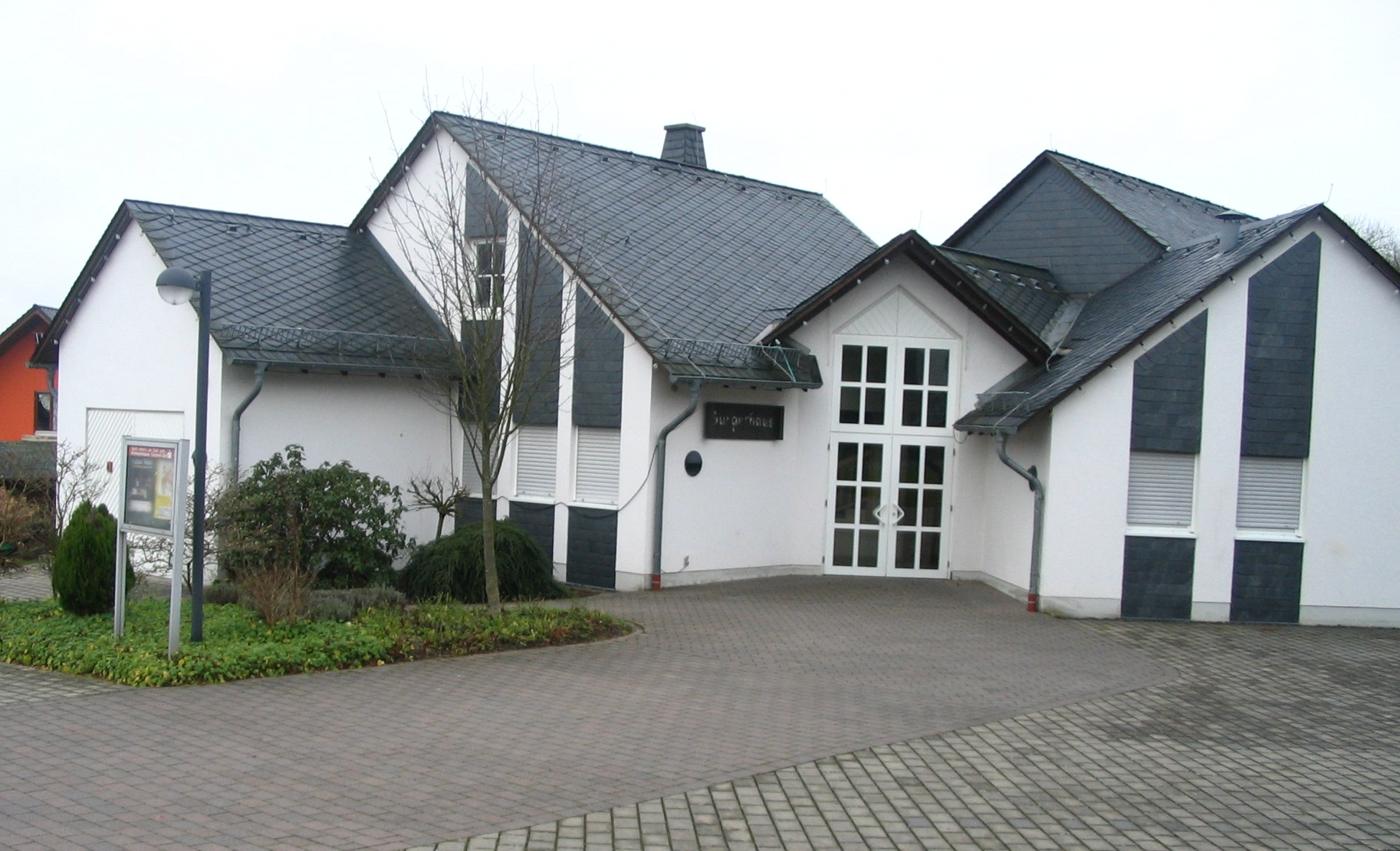
Modern community centre in the village centre

== Culture and sightseeing ==
=== Buildings ===
The following are listed buildings or sites in Rhineland-Palatinate’s Directory of Cultural Monuments:

- Catholic chapel – aisleless church, about 1930

== Economy and infrastructure ==
=== Transport ===
Walhausen lies within the area served by the Verkehrsverbund Rhein-Mosel (Rhine-Moselle Transport Association). Bus route 722 links the village on weekdays to the nearest town, Zell, and the nearest railway station, Bullay (DB) on the Koblenz-Trier railway line.

Running by the municipality, just to the north, is Bundesstraße 421.
