= Blankenrath =

- Municipality
- Coat of arms

- Location of Blankenrath within Cochem-Zell district
- Interactive map of Blankenrath
- Location within Germany Location within Rhineland-Palatinate
- Coordinates: 50°2′21.35″N 7°18′7.68″E
- Country: Germany
- State: Rhineland-Palatinate
- District: Cochem-Zell
- Municipal assoc.: Zell (Mosel)

Government
  - Mayor (2019–24): Jochen Hansen

Area
  - Total: 4.59 km^{2} (1.77 sq mi)
- Elevation: 410 m (1,350 ft)

Population (2025-12-31)
  - Total: 1,646
  - Density: 359/km^{2} (929/sq mi)
- Time zone: UTC+01:00 (CET)
  - Summer (DST): UTC+02:00 (CEST)
- Postal codes: 56865
- Dialling codes: 06545
- Vehicle registration: COC, ZEL
- Website: www.blankenrath.de

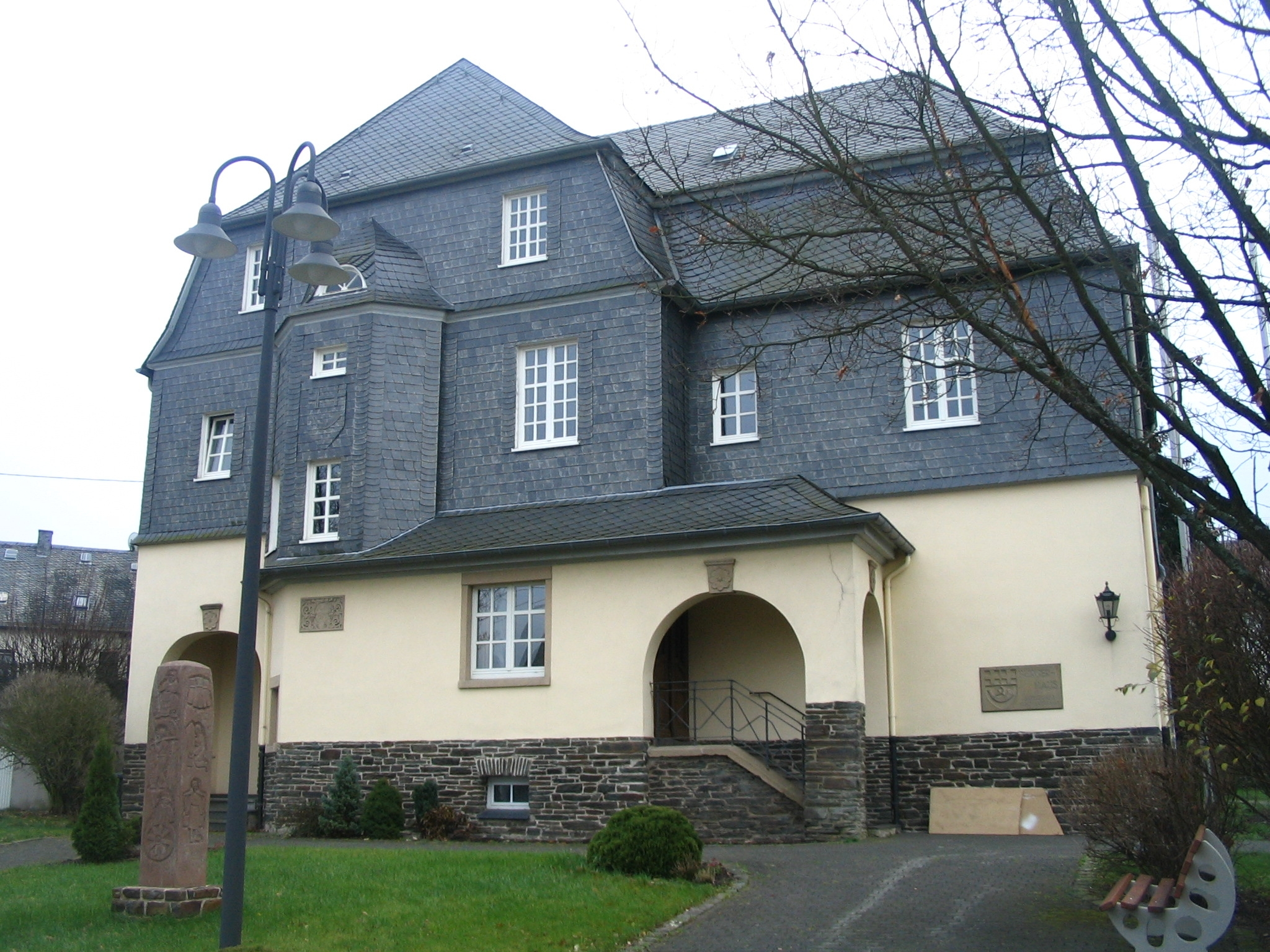
Blankenrath, historic townsman's house

Blankenrath is an Ortsgemeinde – a municipality belonging to a Verbandsgemeinde, a kind of collective municipality – in the Cochem-Zell district in Rhineland-Palatinate, Germany. It belongs to the Verbandsgemeinde of Zell, whose seat is in the municipality of Zell an der Mosel.

== Geography ==
=== Location ===
The municipality lies in the Hunsrück, near Bundesstraße 421. Its lowest elevation is 400 m above sea level and its highest 450 m above sea level.

=== Climate ===
Yearly precipitation in Blankenrath amounts to 856 mm, which is rather high, falling into the highest third of the precipitation chart for all Germany. At 73% of the German Weather Service's weather stations, lower figures are recorded. The driest month is February. The most rainfall comes in June. In that month, precipitation is 1.4 times what it is in February. Precipitation varies minimally and is quite evenly spread over the year. Only 4% of German weather stations report lower seasonal variations.

== Name ==
The name “Blankenrath” means bare, white clearing. It is called, after a former daily reality in the municipality, “The clearing at the white stone” (meant here is the former quarry on the mill path).

== History ==
Blankenrath's history reaches back to the 9th and 10th centuries, to a time when sickness and wars gave rise to a need for people to seek homes away from the crowded river valleys, such as the nearby Moselle valley. According to local lore, the village arose out of three estates, named the Metzenhof, the Geiershof and the Rumershof.

Witnessed in history, however, is Gerlach von Braunshorn's enfeoffment with the Blankenrath court in 1347 by Count Johann von Kleve. In 1362, upon Gerlach's death, it passed by marriage into the Winneburg Counts’ ownership. Later, the landlordship was shared by the Electorate of Trier, the Counts of Sponheim and the Counts of Beilstein. This arrangement began when two of Gerlach's grandsons, namely Gerlach and Cuno von Winneburg, acquired their grandfather's old rights. They could not keep them, however, nor meet their obligations owing to a crushing debt load. Thus, they pledged their holdings to the Electorate of Trier in 1375 for 17,000 Gulden. Their descendants did not pay off their pledge debt to the Electorate of Trier – which was 17,400 Gulden with the interest added – until 164 years after the original transaction, by which time there was no hope of their family's ever regaining its former standing in the community. The Electorate's and the Sponheim comital family's influence had grown so great, that it had become impossible for the now supposedly debt-free Winneburg-Beilstein family (as it was now known) to wield any power.

In 1690, the whole village was destroyed in the ravages of war. Only three farms on the village's outskirts were spared this calamity.

Meanwhile, disputes over who had the lordly rights in Blankenrath continued as time wore on. All together, the disagreement lasted more than two and a half centuries, even reaching the Imperial Chamber Court in Wetzlar, which failed to resolve the matter. The dispute was finally made moot when the Holy Roman Empire and all its governing institutions, including all the lordly families and the Imperial Chamber Court, were swept away in the late 18th and early 19th centuries in the wake of the French Revolutionary Wars and Napoleonic intervention.

Beginning in 1794, Blankenrath lay under French rule. The neighbouring village of Reidenhausen, which hitherto had formed together with Blankenrath a single municipality, was separated. In 1814 Blankenrath was assigned to the Kingdom of Prussia at the Congress of Vienna, and the Amt of Blankenrath was founded. Since 1946, Blankenrath has been part of the then newly founded state of Rhineland-Palatinate. Under the Verwaltungsvereinfachungsgesetz (“Administration Simplification Law”) of 18 July 1970, with effect from 7 November 1970, the municipality was grouped into the Verbandsgemeinde of Zell, losing its Amt status in the process once the municipality of Mastershausen had been transferred to the Rhein-Hunsrück-Kreis, precluding any grounds for Blankenrath to have its own Verbandsgemeinde.

== Politics ==
=== Municipal council ===
The council is made up of 16 council members, who were elected by proportional representation at the municipal election held on 7 June 2009, and the honorary mayor as chairman.

The municipal election held on 7 June 2009 yielded the following results:

| Year | FWG 1 | FWG 2 | Total |
|---|---|---|---|
| 2009 | 10 | 6 | 16 seats |
| 2004 | 9 | 7 | 16 seats |

=== Mayor ===
Blankenrath's mayor is Jochen Hansen, and his deputies are Thomas Geisen and Jürgen Hastenpflug.

=== Coat of arms ===
The municipality's arms might be described thus: Per fess enhanced, party per pale argent a cross sable and argent a cross gules, and gules a bugle-horn sinister of the first.

The black cross stands for the Cologne Cathedral Foundation, the red one for the Prince-Bishopric of Trier. The bugle-horn is the charge borne by the Braunshorn noble family in Beilstein.

The arms have been borne since 5 January 1981.

== Culture and sightseeing ==
=== Buildings ===
The following are listed buildings or sites in Rhineland-Palatinate’s Directory of Cultural Monuments:

- Catholic Church of the Assumption of Mary (Kirche Maria Himmelfahrt), Walhausener Straße – Romanesque tower, Baroque aisleless church, 1761, Romanesque Revival portico; outside Pietà, Gothic Revival crucifix, 19th century; whole complex with old graveyard.
- Hesweiler Straße 1 – villa, Expressionist plastered building, 1933; whole complex with garden.
- Hesweiler Straße 12 – timber-frame Quereinhaus (a combination residential and commercial house divided for these two purposes down the middle, perpendicularly to the street) from 1876; whole complex with barn.
- Hunsrückstraße 17 – timber-frame Quereinhaus, plastered, hipped mansard roof, 1785, characterizes village’s appearance.
- Hunsrückstraße 22 – timber-frame estate complex along the street, 18th/19th century.
- Schulstraße 3 – former school, Swiss chalet style building with mansard roof from 1914.

=== Religion ===
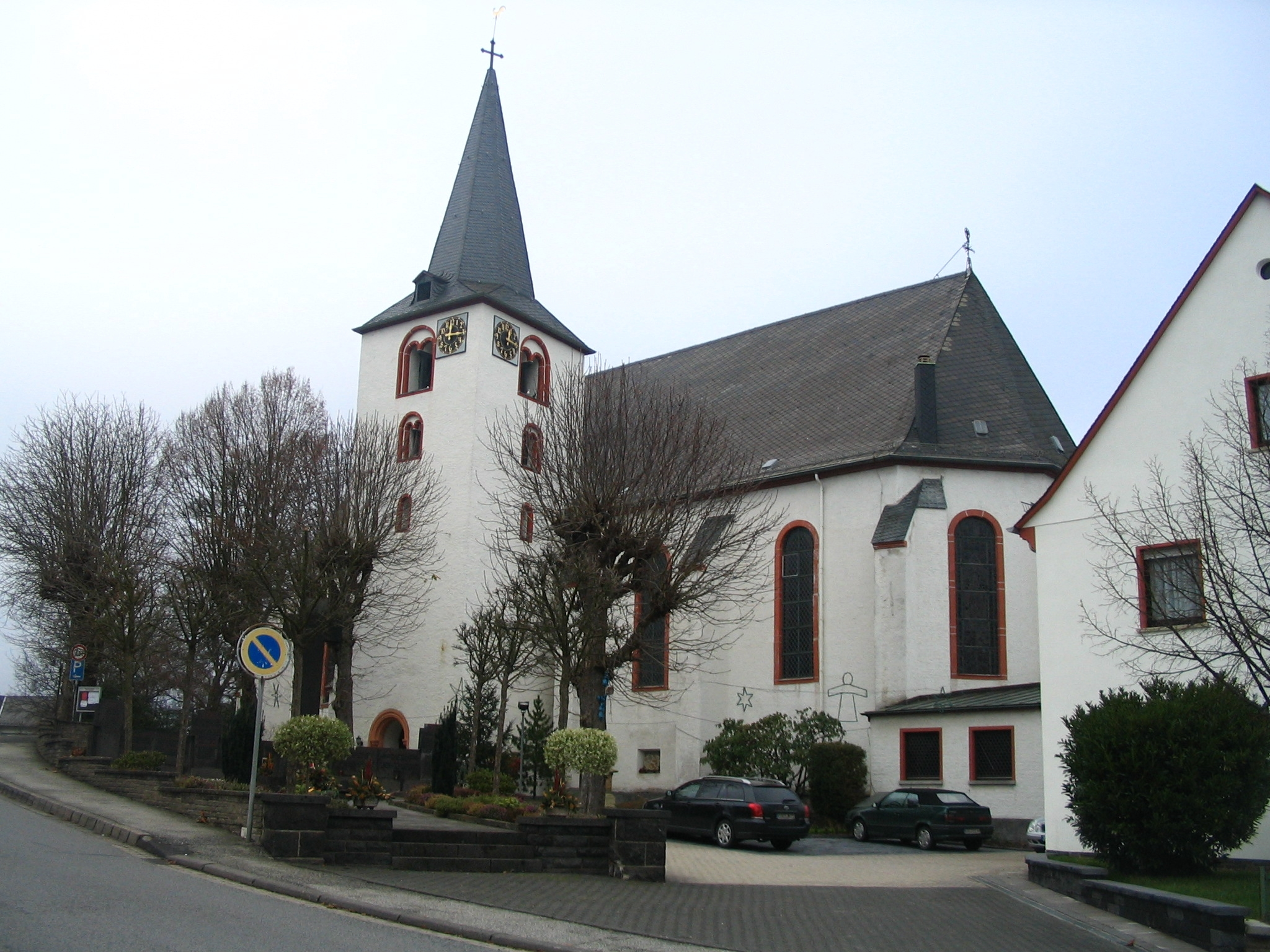
Church in village centre

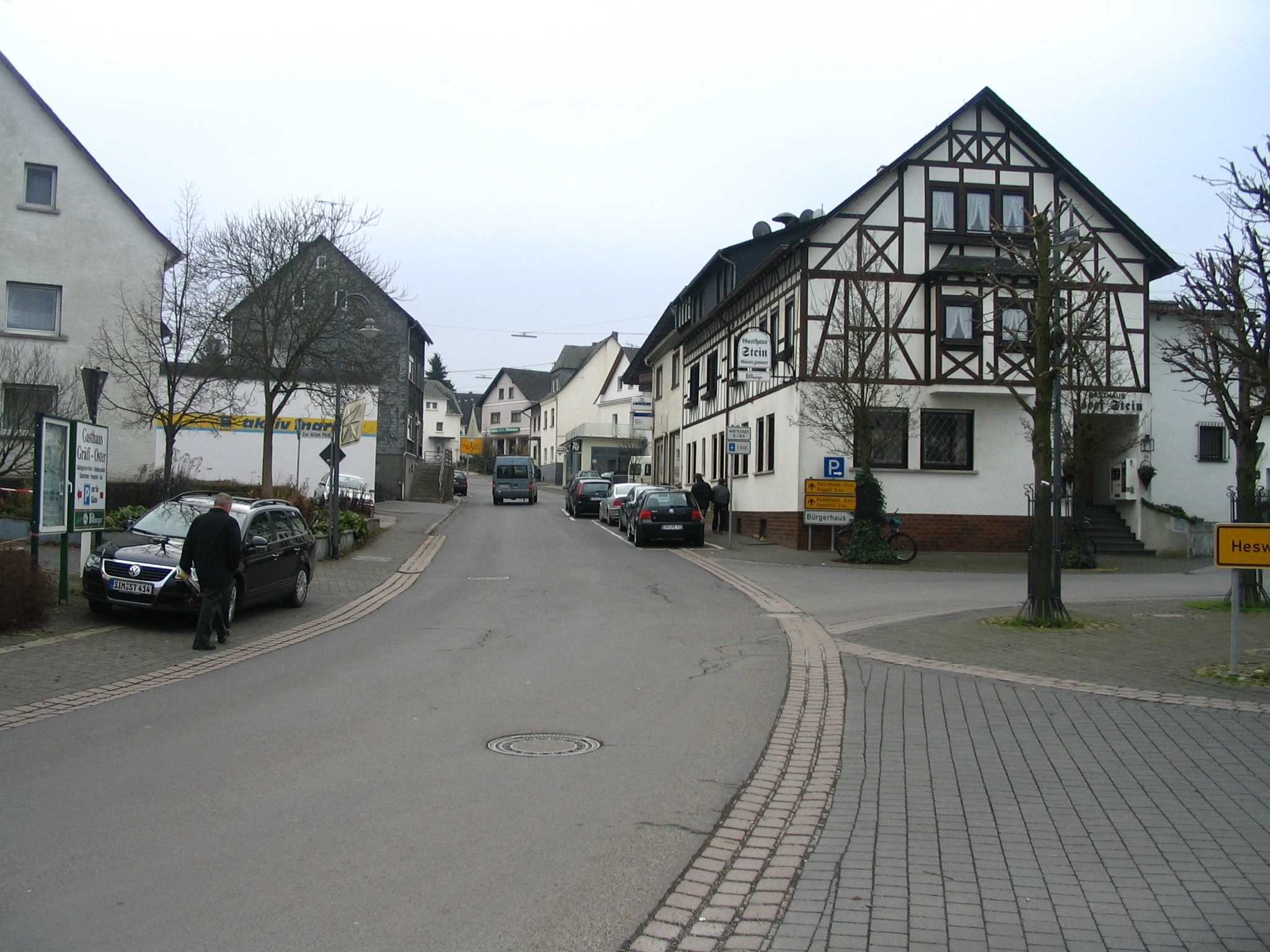
Hauptstraße

There is a Catholic parish in the municipality, called Maria Himmelfahrt (“Assumption of Mary”). The Zell-Bad Bertrich-Blankenrath Evangelical parish, part of the Church District of Simmern-Trarbach, has its Martin Luther Haus in the municipality.

=== Clubs ===
- Sportverein 1927 Blankenrath e.V. (sport club)
- Tennisclub Blankenrath e.V.
- Blankenrather Carneval Verein 1972 e.V. (BCV, Carnival club)
- Heimat- und Verkehrsverein (local history and transport club)
- Trachtengruppe (costume group)
- Musikverein "Kirchspielmusikanten“ (“Parish Musician” music club)
- Männergesangsverein "Liederkranz“ (men's singing club)
- Kinderchor "Rainbow Company“ (children's choir)
- Schützenverein "St. Hubertus“ (shooting club)

== Economy and infrastructure ==
=== Education ===
- Catholic kindergarten
- Municipal kindergarten
- Primary school/Realschule plus (combined Hauptschule and Realschule)

=== Other institutions ===
- Youth centre
- Bildungswerk (educational institute)
- “Waldpark” seniors’ house
- Volunteer fire brigade
