= Pommern, Rhineland-Palatinate =

Pommern
- Municipality
- Coat of arms

- Location of Pommern within Cochem-Zell district
- Interactive map of Pommern
- Location within Germany Location within Rhineland-Palatinate
- Coordinates: 50°10′16″N 7°16′26″E
- Country: Germany
- State: Rhineland-Palatinate
- District: Cochem-Zell
- Municipal assoc.: Cochem

Government
  - Mayor (2019–24): Wilhelm Loosen

Area
  - Total: 5.65 km^{2} (2.18 sq mi)
- Elevation: 85 m (279 ft)

Population (2025-12-31)
  - Total: 401
  - Density: 71.0/km^{2} (184/sq mi)
- Time zone: UTC+01:00 (CET)
  - Summer (DST): UTC+02:00 (CEST)
- Postal codes: 56829
- Dialling codes: 02672
- Vehicle registration: COC
- Website: www.pommern-mosel.de

Pommern is an Ortsgemeinde – a municipality belonging to a Verbandsgemeinde, a kind of collective municipality – in the Cochem-Zell district in Rhineland-Palatinate, Germany. It belongs to the Verbandsgemeinde of Cochem.

== Geography ==
The municipality lies on the river Moselle’s left bank roughly 2 km upstream from Treis-Karden.

== History ==
In 936, the municipality had its first documentary mention as Ponieries villa in a document from Otto I. In a despised act of the gift of Bishop Chrodegang of Metz in 745 in favor of the monastery of Gorze, he gave "753 to Pomaria" (75R) to the Pomeranians (MRR 1,2140). This property was confirmed in 936 and 944 by Otto I of the Abbey of Gorze (MRR I, 892 and 917). In 1107 the monastery of St. Trond also had a property in Pomerania; In the 13th century it was one of the largest landowners in Pomerania (MRR I, 1612). This property was purchased in 1264 by Himmerod Abbey (MRR III, 19555), Beginning in 1264, Himmerod Abbey was the biggest landholder in the village. Previously Arnold von Braunshorn had given 1234 "in Pumere" to the monastery Himmerod a vineyard; The St. Kunibert Abbey sold to Himmerod 1252 estates, in 1256 a Trier domicile (MRUB III, 499,1553 and 1347) was founded. The Abbey of Himmerod in Pomerania maintained its own High Court, which still belonged to the Monastery of St. Trond (LHAKO 1 C 15601). Pomerania was named after Pomerania. In 1312, Kurtrier gave the "Castrum sive domum in Pumere" to the Wilhelm named Walpode of Pomerania (LHAKo lA 4467). In 1330, Winand was called Bock of Pomerania with the "turris" to Pomerania (LHAKo 1 C 2, No. 616). Gender is not named after 1376. Beginning in 1794, Pommern lay under French rule, and Himmerod Abbey was dissolved in 1802. In 1815 Pommern was assigned to the Kingdom of Prussia at the Congress of Vienna. Since 1946, it has been part of the then newly founded state of Rhineland-Palatinate.

== Politics ==
=== Municipal council ===
The council is made up of 12 council members, who were elected at the municipal election held on 7 June 2009, and the honorary mayor as chairman.

The municipal election held on 7 June 2009 yielded the following results:

	SPD	CDU	Total
2009	5	7	12 seats

In 2004, the election was conducted by majority vote.

=== Mayor ===
Pommern's mayor is Wilhelm Loosen.

=== Coat of arms ===
The German blazon reads: Schräglinks geteilt, vorne in Silber ein schrägrechter roter Sparrenbalken, von roten Schindeln begleitet, hinten in Rot zwei ineinanderhängende goldene Ringe schräglinks übereinander.

The municipality's arms might in English heraldic language be described thus: Per bend sinister argent semée of billets a bend dancetty gules and gules two annulets interlaced bendwise sinister Or.

The bend dancetty (diagonal zigzag) and the billets (little rectangles) are charges drawn from arms once borne by "Hans von Pumere" and bearing the year 1368, as recorded in a tapestry at Burg Eltz, a local castle. The annulets, or rings, are a charge borne by the former Himmerod Abbey, who had the biggest landholdings in Pommern. The first vineyard was transferred to the Abbey as early as 1234 by Arnold von Braunshorn. By the 18th century, the Abbey still held responsibility for the church building, as it drew the whole tithe; in 1786 the Abbey built a new, Early Classicist church. The rectory that stands today, the former Himmeroder Hof, is said to be the "loveliest rectory in the Diocese of Trier".

The arms have been borne since 1981.

== Culture and sightseeing ==
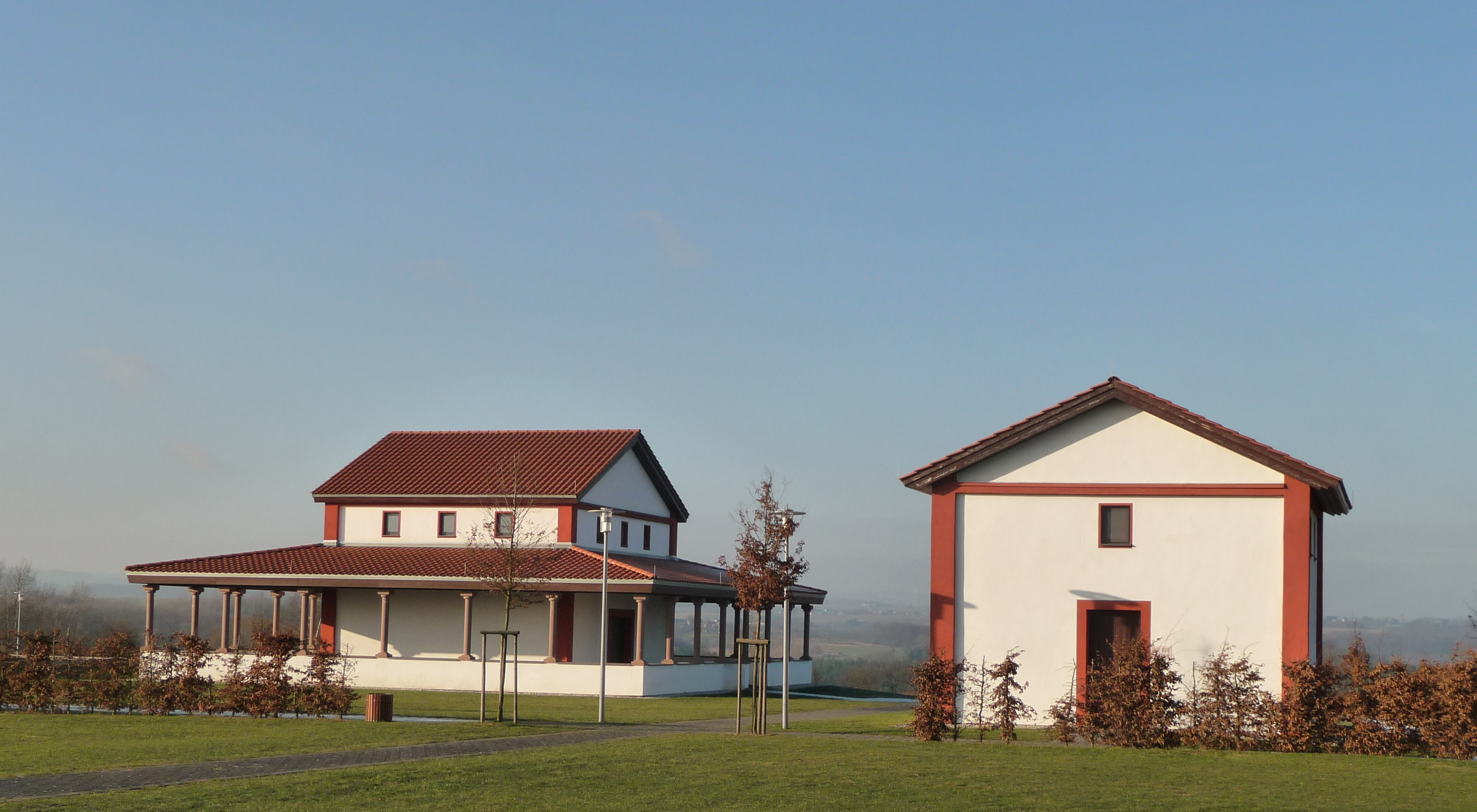
Martberg: Gallo-Roman temple (reconstruction)

=== Buildings ===
The following are listed buildings or sites in Rhineland-Palatinate’s Directory of Cultural Monuments:

- Saint Stephen’s Catholic Parish Church (Pfarrkirche St. Stephan), Bahnhofstraße 25 – separate Early Gothic tower, late 15th century; Baroque aisleless church, 1785; warriors’ memorial, Archangel Michael; baptismal font, 13th century; whole complex
- Am Kapellenberg 1 – Late Gothic solid building, essentially from the 16th or 17th century
- Am Spilles 2 – former inn; big slate quarrystone building, half-hipped roof, marked 1859, and a plastered building, 1885, ballroom with music gallery, front garden
- Am Spilles 3 – former school; three-floor quarrystone building, mid 19th century
- Am Spilles/corner of Hauptstraße – walled garden
- Bahnhofstraße 2 – 15 hearth heating plates and border stones, 17th and 18th centuries
- Bahnhofstraße 3 – winemaker's villa; Late Historicist quarrystone building, partly timber-frame, 1910; whole complex of buildings with commercial wing
- Burgstraße 142 – former Archiepiscopal Castle House; residential tower, later than 1414
- Friedhof – graveyard cross, mid 19th century; base of the Marquet tomb, latter half of the 19th century; grave cross, 20th century; whole complex
- Hauptstraße – wooden sculpture, 18th or 19th century
- Hauptstraße 2 – Late Gothic plastered building, 15th or 16th century, partly with timber framing from the 18th century
- Hauptstraße 25 – winemaker's villa; quarrystone building, about 1920; winepress house behind
- Hauptstraße 26 – winemaker's villa; Late Historicist quarrystone building, partly timber-frame, 1910; whole complex with commercial wing
- Hauptstraße 13/15/17, 19, 21/23, 16, 18/20, 22, 24 (monumental zone) – quarrystone buildings with spire lights characteristic of the village expansion in the early 20th century, about 1910/1920
- Im Brauweiler 1 – Baroque round niche, inside a sandstone sculpture from the 16th or 17th century; grave cross, marked 1576
- Lindenstraße 11 – timber-frame house, partly solid, half-hipped roof, 18th century
- Lindenstraße 114 – timber-frame house, partly solid, mid 17th century
- Moselweinstraße 13 – winemaker's villa; Late Historicist quarrystone building, partly timber-frame, Moselle style, about 1900/1910
- Zehnthofstraße 1 – winemaker's house; quarrystone building, latter half of the 19th century
- Zehnthofstraße 4 – winemaker's house, marked 1878
- Zehnthofstraße 5 – rectory, former Himmeroder Hof; two-winged building from 15th to 18th century, essentially Late Gothic, expanded in Baroque times; Classicist outer doorway, marked 1786
- Zehnthofstraße 6 – timber-frame house, partly solid, 18th century
- Zehnthofstraße 8 – timber-frame house, partly solid, half-hipped roof, marked 1740, essentially possibly older; arch on the side, marked 1564
- Zehnthofstraße 9 – Electoral high court, former manor and courthouse; plastered building, 1785
- Zehnthofstraße 14 – three-floor timber-frame house, partly solid, marked 1623 and 1828 (conversion)
- Zehnthofstraße 20 – Electoral-Trier Amtshaus; three-floor timber-frame house, partly solid, stone staircase, marked 1585, half-hipped roof, 17th century
- Zehnthofstraße 26 – hearth heating plate, 16th century, 1732; cast-iron coat of arms; hand pump
- Zum Daupes 1 – timber-frame house, partly solid, plastered, steep half-hipped roof, 17th century
- On Bundesstraße 49, going towards Karden – Olligs-Heiligenhäuschen (Heiligenhäuschen: a small, shrinelike structure consecrated to a saint or saints), Wayside Chapel to the Holy Trinity (Wegekapelle Zur Heiligen Dreifaltigkeit); partly timber-frame, marked 1712; three high reliefs, 17th century; Baroque statuary
- In the vineyard – sundial, high rectangular tablet
- Way of the Cross with Mount of Olives Chapel – chapel, Gothic Revival plastered building; altar table, eight Gothic Revival figures, pietà; 14 Stations of the Cross, Ölbergkapelle (Mount of Olives Chapel) and Bildstock type with relief, late 19th century
- Martberg – Gallo-Roman area, protected zone against digging
- Beside the fourth Station of the Cross – basalt wayside cross, marked 1674
- North of Pommern – wayside cross with pedestal
- East of Pommern in the vineyard – basalt wayside cross, marked 1587

=== Regular events ===
- Spillesfest: (winemaker's chapel summer night festival): Whitsun
- Kirmes (parish fair): first weekend in August
- Winzer-Hof-Fest ("Winemaker’s Estate Festival"): third weekend in September
- Uferrock Open Air Festival: July

== Economy and infrastructure ==
Within the municipality of Pommern lie the vineyards of Pommerner Rosenberg, Pommerner Sonnenuhr, Pommerner Goldberg and Pommerner Zeisel.

== Sundry ==
The name "Pommern" is also the name for Pomerania in German.
