= Faid, Rhineland-Palatinate =

Faid
- Municipality
- Location of Faid within Cochem-Zell district
- Interactive map of Faid
- Location within Germany Location within Rhineland-Palatinate
- Coordinates: 50°8′41″N 7°7′9″E
- Country: Germany
- State: Rhineland-Palatinate
- District: Cochem-Zell
- Municipal assoc.: Cochem

Government
  - Mayor (2019–24): Stefan Thomas

Area
  - Total: 8.23 km^{2} (3.18 sq mi)
- Elevation: 388 m (1,273 ft)

Population (2025-12-31)
  - Total: 1,031
  - Density: 125/km^{2} (324/sq mi)
- Time zone: UTC+01:00 (CET)
  - Summer (DST): UTC+02:00 (CEST)
- Postal codes: 56814
- Dialling codes: 02671
- Vehicle registration: COC
- Website: www.faid.de

Faid is an Ortsgemeinde – a municipality belonging to a Verbandsgemeinde, a kind of collective municipality – in the Cochem-Zell district in Rhineland-Palatinate, Germany. It belongs to the Verbandsgemeinde of Cochem, whose seat is in the like-named town.

== Geography ==
The municipality lies at the edge of the Eifel near the river Moselle, 6 km west of the district seat of Cochem. Faid's municipal area comprises 823 ha, of which 363 ha is wooded and another 261 ha is used for agriculture. The nearby mountain, the “Galgenkopf” (“Gallows Head”), has an elevation of 413 m above sea level.

== History ==
About Faid's beginnings, nothing can be said with any certainty. According to a legend, the village's name comes from Fett – German for “fat” – from the story that holds that the village once had to supply the lordly kitchen with fat. It seems likelier, though, that the name comes from the Latin word feudum, which means “fief” (and which also yields the English word “feudal”). Another scholarly opinion, however, holds that the name is indeed of Latin origin, but that it rather comes from fagus, the word for “beech”.

In 943, Faid had its first documentary mention in a donation document made out for the Stablo Monastery. A further document from 1255 states that a lady was donating her holdings at Vyde to Himmerod Abbey. In a 1518 agreement between Feudt and townsmen from Klotten, the latter party ceded a piece of land lying before Serberg to the Feudter (the former party). For this service, Faid was obliged to deliver to the church in Klotten three fourths of a pound of wax each year.

Faid formed together with Cochem a single municipality. In a 1678 Electoral decree, it was declared that the Faid dwellers were fellow townsmen of the town of Cochem, and as such, they were spared levies imposed by the Amt, although they had to do compulsory labour in Cochem. As seen in a bill that has come down from 17 November 1695, any townsman from Faid who went to live in Cochem needed to pay only half for this privilege that those from other places paid.

Faid shared woodlands and wilderness with the town of Cochem, and from time to time, this caused problems. On 29 March 1546, Elector Ludwig von Hagen decreed that each townsman from Faid who wanted to build a new house had leave to remove from the communal forest two cartloads of wood; however, he had to announce his intention beforehand to the mayor in Cochem, who then sent along a sworn forestry officer who would then score each of the trees that the villager was allowed to cut. Firewood seemed to be a particular problem in the communal forest, so much so that in 1744 Cochem town council saw fit to refuse Faid dwellers the privilege of gathering firewood in the parts of the communal forest known as Daustert and Heinterwald, restricting their firewood gathering to Serberg, and then only on established firewood gathering days. The villagers, for their part, refused the new decree and kept gathering firewood in Daustert and Heinterwald, bringing about various incidents between the authorities and the townsmen. In one incident, a squad of armed men led by Cochem's chronicler forced their way into a household whose owner's daughter had been caught unlawfully gathering firewood, threw all his belongings about, and seized a calf that they found in a stall, it being the only thing of value. The Elector's response in the face of the villagers’ complaints does not seem to have been very helpful, for they eventually went along with the decree.

Even when the forest was partitioned in 1793, the Faiders complained that they had not been given their fair share in the deal. The French Revolutionary Wars, however, soon put an end to any pursuit of the village's claims. In 1828, a further attempt at settling the dispute over the woodlands came to an end when Cochem withdrew its offer of one fourth of the forest district of Schleimet once Faid had angrily turned it down, insisting on the village's claim to the whole of Schleimet. The last chapter in this saga came in 1832 when the municipality of Faid turned to the Royal Government at Koblenz, which ruled that since the Faiders had been using their part of the forest without any apparent problem since the partition, they obviously agreed with it.

Grazing rights were one more thing that brought the village into disputes. In an effort to soothe the villagers’ worries about losing them, Elector Jakob von Eltz decreed in 1571 that Faid had grazing rights right up to the edge of Cochem's vineyards, but only in winter. In summer, the village's herdsmen had to keep their stock on the mountain. In 1575, when the young lord Pfilipp zu Winneburg built a sheep farm at Winneburg (castle) and his shepherds often led their flocks across Faid's limits, the Faiders took his wethers, rams and goats away and sold them, as the bailiff of Cochem had advised them to do. This they kept doing until the grazing incursions stopped.

Faid was somewhat less successful in keeping its grazing rights in Cochem's wild lands. About 1840, Cochem claimed that Faid had no such rights, and forbade the villagers to graze their livestock there. Nevertheless, they once again ignored an official pronouncement, and the village shepherd continued to graze his sheep in the wild lands, for which offence he was booked and subsequently penalized by the court. The village then decided to send a delegation to Trier to seek the old documents granting them grazing rights in the wild lands in the old Electoral archive. The delegates were turned away and told that the more recent Prussian administration had had all such documents transferred to Koblenz. No such thing was to be found there, however, and Faid thereby lost its grazing rights in Cochem's wild lands. As it later turned out, no delegation had ever needed to go anywhere. In 1887 – somewhat too late for the delegation's purposes – the document that had been sought was found – in Faid's own municipal chest.

Towards the end of the 17th century, the village of Faid did not stand on quite the same spot as today, but rather somewhat to the northwest. The church stood at the village's east end. Old writings suggest here and there that the churchyard was surrounded by such a high wall that the villagers used it in times of need as a refuge. Furthermore, in 1689, after the conquest of the town of Cochem in the Nine Years' War (known in Germany as the Pfälzischer Erbfolgekrieg, or War of the Palatine Succession), eleven townsmen from Cochem were held in the churchyard by the French, who had taken them hostage. The siege of Cochem had also wrought great hardship in Faid, which sometime between 1680 and 1684 had been almost utterly destroyed in a great fire, just before the French came. Once there, their efforts to defend against the German Emperor's forces eventually brought about yet another great fire, which burnt the village to the ground; only the church was left standing. When Faid was built anew, the building was done around the old church, essentially moving the village to the southeast, and even leaving one street once wholly within the village – Bohrgasse – wholly outside it.

The bad luck continued into the 18th century with yet another great fire, this one set off by lightning, on 13 July 1714. This time, the church was not spared, and all but a few houses burnt down, along with a great deal of livestock. A plea was made to the Elector to lift certain levies for a period of three years to ease the great “poverty and ruin” that the fire had brought down on the village.

In 1718, on the Elector's orders, all land was measured, and the information yielded by this survey was compiled into a Grund- und Extraktbuch, a catalogue not only of land measurements, but also ownership. Non-resident owners at this time were Himmerod Abbey, Stuben Monastery, Sieburg Monastery, the Foundation at Pfalzel (nowadays an outlying centre of Trier) and the virgins’ convent at Karden. Hunting rights were held by the Lords of Metternich-Winneburg, as were fishing rights on the Ellerbach, although these were actually jointly held with the Elector of Trier. The monastic institutions were later stripped of their landholdings in 1794 when the French Revolutionary occupation began.

The Seven Years' War was particularly hard on Faid, then known as Faith (this was pronounced more like “fight” than like the English word spelt the same way, as is the name's modern form, too). The villagers were forever having to supply and billet troops, a very costly and burdensome exercise.

In 1815 Faid was assigned to the Kingdom of Prussia at the Congress of Vienna. Since 1946, it has been part of the then newly founded state of Rhineland-Palatinate.

== Politics ==
=== Municipal council ===
The council is made up of 16 council members, who were elected by majority vote at the municipal election held on 7 June 2009, and the honorary mayor as chairman.

=== Mayor ===
Faid's mayor is Stefan Thomas.

=== Coat of arms ===
The German blazon reads: Zweimal gespaltener Schild im roten Feld ein aus dem Schildfuß wachsender goldener Abtsstab, silbernes Feld mit schwarzem, rot bewehrten Wolf mit roter Zunge. Rotes Feld mit goldener Palme.

The municipality's arms might in English heraldic language be described thus: Gules a pale argent surmounted by a wolf rampant sable armed and langued of the first, the whole between an abbot's staff issuant from base Or and a palm leaf palewise of the same.

The gold abbot's staff refers to the monastic institutions at Pfalzel, Himmerod, Springiersbach, Siegburg and Stuben, which all owned holdings in Faid, although in the early 19th century, these were auctioned off by the French. The central charge on the pale, the wolf, is borrowed from the arms borne by Stavelot in Belgium. The Monastery there was the first one to receive a donation of a holding in Faid, in 943. The palm leaf is Saint Stephen’s attribute, thus representing the church's patron saint, who was mentioned as being such as early as 1470, and then again in 1656. As early as Romanesque times, a church stood in Faid.

The arms were designed by A. Friderichs of Zell.

== Culture and sightseeing ==
=== Buildings ===
The following are listed buildings or sites in Rhineland-Palatinate’s Directory of Cultural Monuments:

- Saint Stephen’s Catholic Parish Church (Pfarrkirche St. Stephan), Dorfstraße 36 – Romanesque (?) west tower, aisleless church 1750; eight grave crosses, 17th and 18th century
- Dorfstraße – Quereinhaus (a combination residential and commercial house divided for these two purposes down the middle, perpendicularly to the street)
- Dorfstraße 15 – Quereinhaus; timber-frame building, partly solid, from 1750
- Dorfstraße 19 – Quereinhaus; timber-frame building, partly solid, from 1839
- Near Dorfstraße 36 – sandstone graveyard cross, from 1847
- Entepfuhl – well with well house
- Stiergass 1 – Quereinhaus; timber-frame building, partly solid, plastered, 18th or 19th century
