= Valwig =

- Municipality
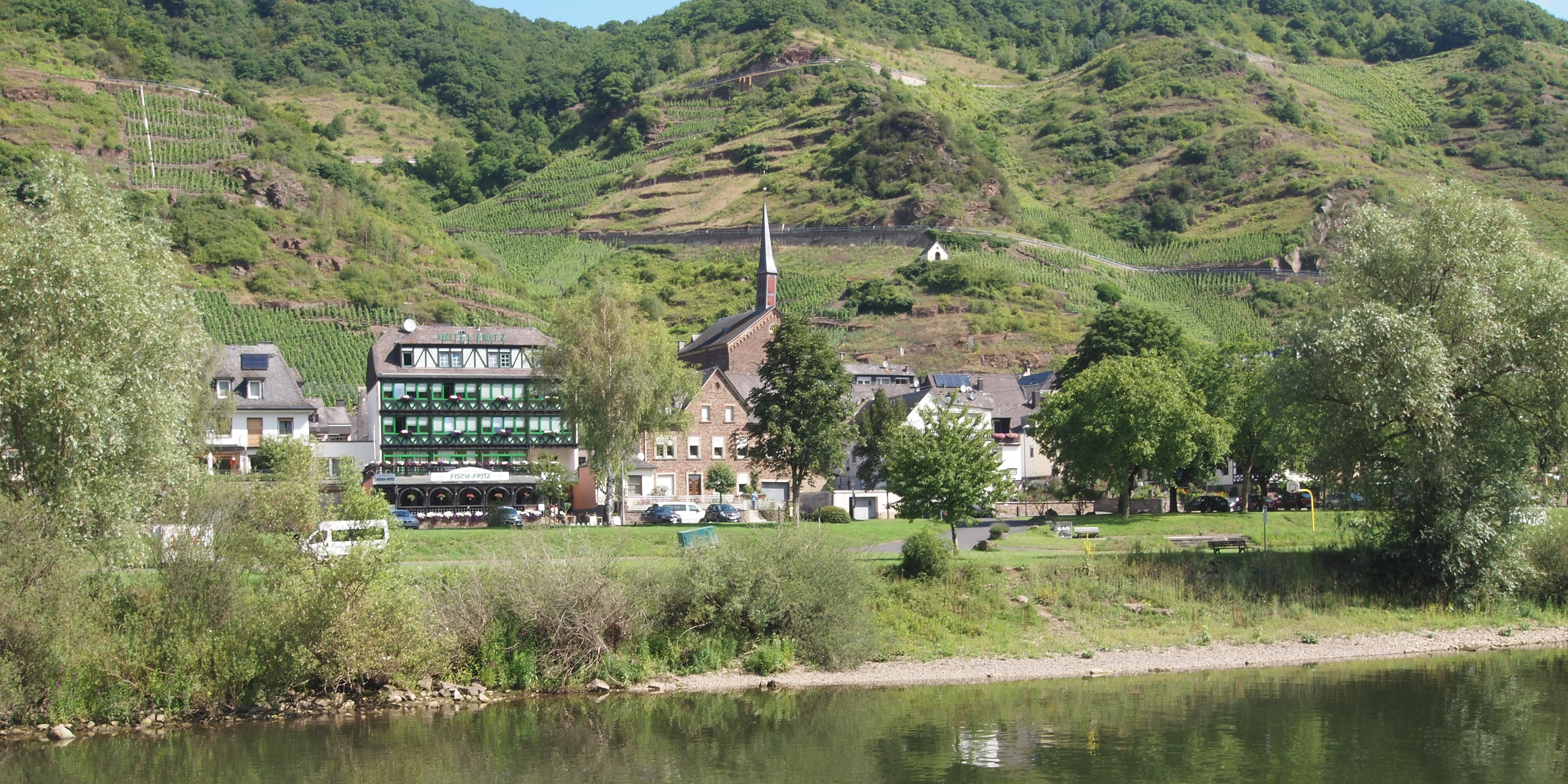

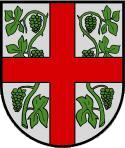
- Coat of arms

- Location of Valwig within Cochem-Zell district
- Interactive map of Valwig
- Location within Germany Location within Rhineland-Palatinate
- Coordinates: 50°8′35″N 7°12′37″E
- Country: Germany
- State: Rhineland-Palatinate
- District: Cochem-Zell
- Municipal assoc.: Cochem
- Subdivisions: 2

Government
  - Mayor (2019–24): Angela Irene Balensiefen

Area
  - Total: 5.70 km^{2} (2.20 sq mi)
- Elevation: 100 m (330 ft)

Population (2025-12-31)
  - Total: 427
  - Density: 74.9/km^{2} (194/sq mi)
- Time zone: UTC+01:00 (CET)
  - Summer (DST): UTC+02:00 (CEST)
- Postal codes: 56812
- Dialling codes: 02671
- Vehicle registration: COC

Valwig is an Ortsgemeinde – a municipality belonging to a Verbandsgemeinde, a kind of collective municipality – in the Cochem-Zell district in Rhineland-Palatinate, Germany. It belongs to the Verbandsgemeinde of Cochem, whose seat is in the like-named town. Valwig is also a winegrowing centre.

== Geography ==
=== Location ===
The municipality lies on the river Moselle’s right bank (at kilometre 55). The district seat of Cochem is some 3 km away.

=== Geology ===
The Moselle valley is part of the Rheinisches Schiefergebirge (Rhenish Slate Mountains) and is marked by steep and craggy mountain slopes.

=== Neighbouring municipalities ===
Valwig’s municipal area borders along the Moselle downstream on Cochem, and upstream on Bruttig-Fankel, and it is separated by the Moselle itself from Ernst. Over the Valwigerberg (mountain), Treis-Karden can be reached.

=== Constituent communities ===
Valwig’s Ortsteile are:

- Valwig/Mosel (72 m above sea level)
- Valwigerberg (300 m above sea level)

== History ==
In the earliest documents, Valwig is mentioned under the names Falavoia (AD 866), Falaveia (893) und Valefayer (1130). It is, however, assumed that both Celts and Romans lived in Valwig. This is seen in the Celtic-Roman name Balbiacum, meaning “Balbius’s Settlement”. Valwig is therefore one of the oldest settlements along the Moselle. With the occupation of the Rhine’s left bank by French Revolutionary troops in 1794, the Electorate of Trier, for centuries the local overlord, fell. In 1814 it was assigned to the Kingdom of Prussia at the Congress of Vienna. Since 1946, it has been part of the then newly founded state of Rhineland-Palatinate.

== Politics ==
=== Municipal council ===
The council is made up of 8 council members, who were elected by majority vote at the municipal election held on 7 June 2009, and the honorary mayor as chairman.

=== Coat of arms ===
The municipality’s arms might be described thus: Argent a cross gules surmounting two vines each slipped and fructed and leafed of three vert.

== Culture and sightseeing ==
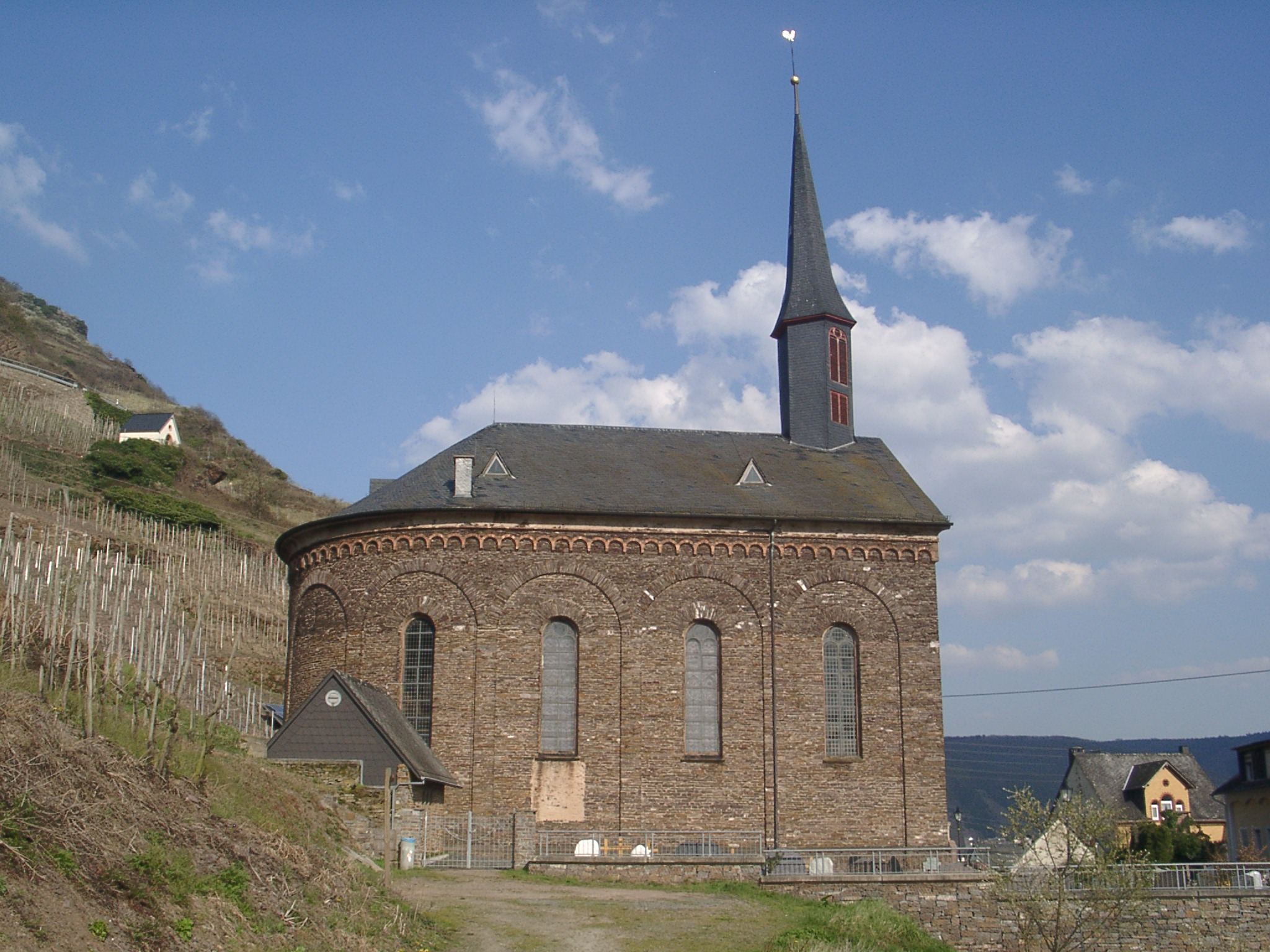
Saint Martin’s Church

=== Buildings ===
The following are listed buildings or sites in Rhineland-Palatinate’s Directory of Cultural Monuments:

==== Valwig (main centre) ====
- Saint Martin’s Catholic Church (branch church; Filialkirche St. Martin), Kreuzstraße – three-naved quarrystone hall church, Rundbogenstil, 1823-1826, architect Johann Claudius von Lassaulx, Koblenz; graveyard: missionary cross, 1867; warriors’ memorial, stele with relief; grave crosses; 18th century; Meschel grave cross, died 1870; whole complex with graveyard
- Bachstraße 2 – timber-frame house, partly solid, early 17th century, gateway arch marked 1607
- Bachstraße 4 – former school; three-floor timber-frame (?) house, plastered, essentially possibly from the 16th century
- Brühlstraße 16 – winemaker’s house; quarrystone building, marked 1610
- Herrenbergstraße 12 – winepress house; timber-frame building, partly solid, 18th century
- Near In der Schweiz 10 – basalt wayside cross, marked 1767
- Kreuzstraße 5 – timber-frame house, partly solid, plastered, 17th century
- Kreuzstraße 6 – quarrystone building, corbel frieze, mid 19th century
- Vineyard chapel – basalt aisleless church, marked 1619

==== Valwigerberg ====
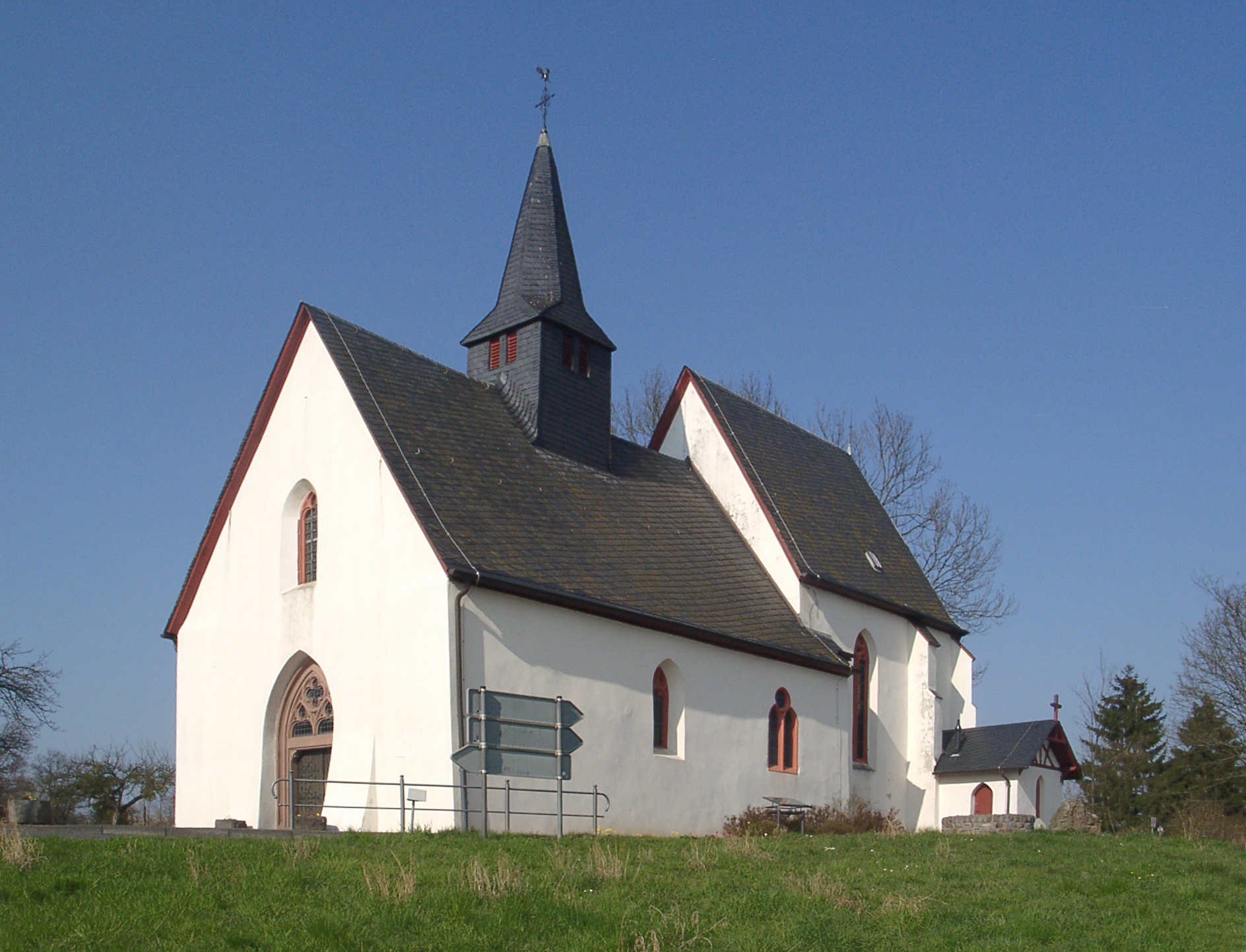
Valwigerberg, Kapellenweg: Saint Mary’s and Mary Magdalene’s Pilgrimage Church

- Saint Mary’s and Mary Magdalene’s Pilgrimage Church (Wallfahrtskirche St. Maria und Maria Magdalena), Kapellenweg – Late Gothic quire, about 1440, three-naved pseudobasilica, about 1500/1510 (see also below)
- Kapellenweg 3 – former rectory; building with half-hipped roof, timber framing plastered, partly solid, about 1760
- Stations of the Cross – four Stations of the Cross

=== Wallfahrtskirche St. Maria und Maria Magdalena ===
The building of the little pilgrimage chapel on the Valwiger Berg goes all the way back to the mid 15th century. After a great number of stories of answered prayers, it was built by Sir Johann von Winneburg to pay homage to the “wonder-working image of Our Lady of the Mountain”.

=== Hiking trails ===
Running along Valwig’s vineyards, where Riesling is grown, are two well known hiking trails. Down the Moselle towards Cochem leads the 7.5 km-long Apolloweg Valwig. It was brought into existence by the municipality of Valwig by, among other ways, using funds from the European LEADER II programme. More recently, another trail has been built, the 4.4 km-long BREVA Weg, running up the Moselle to the outlying centre of Valwigerberg and the neighbouring municipality of Bruttig-Fankel. This was a cooperative project undertaken by the municipalities of Bruttig-Fankel, Ernst and Valwig, hence the acronym used as its name.
