= Nehren =

Nehren is the name of two communes in Germany:

- Nehren, Baden-Württemberg, located in the district of Tübingen, Baden-Württemberg
- Nehren, Rhineland-Palatinate, a village in the district Cochem-Zell, Rhineland-Palatinate
