= Briedern =

- Municipality
- Coat of arms

- Location of Briedern within Cochem-Zell district
- Interactive map of Briedern
- Location within Germany Location within Rhineland-Palatinate
- Coordinates: 50°6′33.19″N 7°12′37.73″E
- Country: Germany
- State: Rhineland-Palatinate
- District: Cochem-Zell
- Municipal assoc.: Cochem

Government
  - Mayor (2019–24): Peter Görgen

Area
  - Total: 3.55 km^{2} (1.37 sq mi)
- Elevation: 85 m (279 ft)

Population (2025-12-31)
  - Total: 338
  - Density: 95.2/km^{2} (247/sq mi)
- Time zone: UTC+01:00 (CET)
  - Summer (DST): UTC+02:00 (CEST)
- Postal codes: 56820
- Dialling codes: 02673
- Vehicle registration: COC

Briedern is an Ortsgemeinde – a municipality belonging to a Verbandsgemeinde, a kind of collective municipality – in the Cochem-Zell district in Rhineland-Palatinate, Germany. It belongs to the Verbandsgemeinde of Cochem, whose seat is in the like-named town.

== Geography ==
The municipality lies on the river Moselle upstream from the weir at Bruttig-Fankel between Cochem and Zell in the middle of the Cochemer Krampen, a 24-kilometre-long stretch of the Moselle made up of many winding bows. The municipality's best known winegrowing operation (Rüberberger Domherrenberg) is found on the steep slopes over on the other side of the Moselle.

== History ==
In 1275, Briedern had its first documentary mention. Saint Servatius's Church (Servatiuskirche), built at this same time, was along with Saint Servatius's Spring a pilgrimage destination; from the years 1466, 1493 and 1499 come accounts of the granting of indulgences to pilgrims. In 1595, Briedern was attacked by Anton Langhaar ("Anthony Longhair"), who wrought his evil deeds from his home base in Kastellaun in the Hunsrück. The Briederners, though, managed to put up a good fight against him. Beginning in 1794, Briedern lay under French rule. In 1814 it was assigned to the Kingdom of Prussia at the Congress of Vienna. Parts of the village were destroyed by shelling in 1945. Since 1946, Briedern has been part of the then newly founded state of Rhineland-Palatinate.

== Politics ==
=== Municipal council ===
The council is made up of 8 council members, who were elected at the municipal election held on 7 June 2009, and the honorary mayor as chairman.

The municipal election held on 7 June 2009 yielded the following results:

	Bleser	Könen	Scheuren	Total
2009	5	2	1	8 seats

=== Coat of arms ===
The municipality's arms might be described thus: Per fess argent a vine issuant from the line of partition in dexter and embowed to dexter, leafed of three and fructed of two, all proper, and azure in base water of the first in which a wooden boat proper, the prow to sinister and ensigned with a cross.

== Culture and sightseeing ==
=== Buildings ===
The following are listed buildings or sites in Rhineland-Palatinate's Directory of Cultural Monuments:

- Saint Servatius's Catholic Church (Servatiuskirche), Moselstraße 14 – Late Romanesque west tower, 13th century, Late Gothic cupola, nave from latter half of 15th century (essentially Romanesque?), sacristy from latter half of 16th century with timber-frame upper structure from 1592, Crucifixion group, wayside cross (?) from 1687; whole complex with graveyard
- Hauptstraße 2 – old school, quarrystone building from about 1900
- Hauptstraße 7 – solid building, essentially possibly mediaeval, in the gable a late mediaeval window, hearth
- Hauptstraße/corner of Römerstraße – grave cross from 1776
- Moselstraße 12 – solid building bearing, among other yeardates, 1546, 16th/17th century, timber-frame wing with twinned windows, cross integrated into the masonry
- Moselstraße 22 – timber-frame house, partly solid from 1665, half-hipped roof from 17th century
- Moselstraße 16-19, Servatiusstraße 1 (monumental zone) – Late Historicist plastered buildings from 1900-1910
- Rathausstraße 2 – former school, solid building from 16th/17th century
- Schmiedegasse 2 – plastered quarrystone building, essentially late mediaeval
- Vineyard chapel, southeast of the village on the Wahlberg – quarrystone building, 19th century
- Servatius-Brunnen – spring
- Altes Backeshaus – "Old Bakehouse"

== Clubs ==
- Heimat- und Verkehrsverein Briedern (local history and transport)
- Freiwillige Feuerwehr Briedern (volunteer fire brigade)
- Jugendfeuerwehr Briedern (youth fire brigade)
- Angel Sport Verein Briedern-Beilstein (angling)
- Freizeitmannschaft Zirwes-Jungs Briedern (German equivalent of Sunday league football)
- Briederner Möhnen (women's Carnival/Shrovetide club)
- Kirchenchor Beilstein-Briedern (church choir)
