= Mesenich =

- Municipality
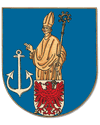
- Coat of arms

- Location of Mesenich within Cochem-Zell district
- Interactive map of Mesenich
- Location within Germany Location within Rhineland-Palatinate
- Coordinates: 50°5′51″N 7°11′52″E
- Country: Germany
- State: Rhineland-Palatinate
- District: Cochem-Zell
- Municipal assoc.: Cochem

Government
  - Mayor (2019–24): Peter Serwazi

Area
  - Total: 2.98 km^{2} (1.15 sq mi)
- Elevation: 95 m (312 ft)

Population (2025-12-31)
  - Total: 306
  - Density: 103/km^{2} (266/sq mi)
- Time zone: UTC+01:00 (CET)
  - Summer (DST): UTC+02:00 (CEST)
- Postal codes: 56820
- Dialling codes: 02673
- Vehicle registration: COC
- Website: www.mesenich.de

Mesenich is an Ortsgemeinde – a municipality belonging to a Verbandsgemeinde, a kind of collective municipality – in the Cochem-Zell district in Rhineland-Palatinate, Germany. It belongs to the Verbandsgemeinde of Cochem, whose seat is in the like-named town. Mesenich is a winegrowing centre.

== Geography ==
The municipality lies on the river Moselle roughly 4 km southeast of Cochem.

== History ==
Finds from the Stone Age, remnants of Roman settlements and graves from Merovingian times bear witness to the municipality's early days.

As early as 1050, Mesenich had its first documentary mention in connection with the Polish queen and count palatine's daughter Richeza's donation to the Brauweiler Benedictine Monastery near Cologne.

The municipality's name, originally Mesinich, is, like most other nearby villages’ names, of Celtic origin. Besides winegrowing and subsistence agriculture, shipbuilding was an important means of livelihood. This explains why an anchor is included as a charge in the municipality's coat of arms.

Between 1050 and 1088, the Abbot of Brauweiler, Wolfhelm, had the parish church built; it is consecrated to Saint Nicholas. The church had its first documentary mention on 18 November 1088 in a document from Archbishop of Trier Egilbert. In the course of the centuries, the church has been remodelled several times.

About 1200, the Romanesque churchtower was renovated, in 1730 the church got the main and side altars that it still has today and in 1736, the Baroque nave was consecrated. After the renovation in 1971, the church took on its current appearance.

The architectural focal point in the municipality today is the Late Baroque-Classicist Brauweiler Hof, which until the late 18th century served as the tithing manor. It was built in 1771 under master builder Nikolaus Lauxen, and today it is under private ownership.

After French Revolutionary troops occupied the lands on the Rhine’s left bank in 1794, the monastery holdings were sold off. In 1814 Mesenich was assigned to the Kingdom of Prussia at the Congress of Vienna. Since 1946, it has been part of the then newly founded state of Rhineland-Palatinate.

== Politics ==
=== Municipal council ===
The council is made up of 8 council members, who were elected by majority vote at the municipal election held on 7 June 2009, and the honorary mayor as chairwoman.

=== Mayor ===
Mesenich’s mayor is Peter Serwazi.

=== Coat of arms ===
The German blazon reads: Im Blau einen nach halbrechts gewandten Bischof in goldenem Gewand mit Mitra und Stab in der Linke, mit der Rechten einen silbernen schwebenden Anker segnend, zu seinen Füßen einen silbernen Schild, darin ein roter Adler, hinter dem ein Bischofstab schräglinks zu sehen ist.

The municipality’s arms might in English heraldic language be described thus: Azure Saint Nicholas in trian aspect proper vested and mitred Or, in his sinister hand a bishop’s staff of the same, his dexter hand raised in benediction over an anchor argent, surmounting his legs an inescutcheon of the same charged with an eagle displayed gules surmounting a bishop’s staff bendwise sinister of the first.

The bishop who stands as the main charge in the municipality’s arms is the church’s patron saint, Nicholas, who was also the Brauweiler Monastery’s patron saint, and to whom Archbishop Egilbert of Trier consecrated Mesenich’s first chapel on 18 November 1088. The charge that Nicholas is “blessing”, the anchor, stands for the village's sailing men and shipbuilders of yore. The inescutcheon at the saint's feet is the Brauweiler Monastery's arms, thus representing the municipality's former feudal lords, who also held court jurisdiction.

The arms were designed by H. Gutensohn of Koblenz and have been borne since 7 March 1952.

== Culture and sightseeing ==
=== Buildings ===
The following are listed buildings or sites in Rhineland-Palatinate’s Directory of Cultural Monuments:

- Saint Nicholas’s Catholic Parish Church (Pfarrkirche St. Nikolaus) – Romanesque west tower, possibly about 1200, upper part possibly Late Gothic, possibly about 1480; Baroque aisleless nave, marked 1733, sacristy, marked 168(8?); grave cross, 18th century; graveyard, Coronation of the Virgin group, 18th century; warriors’ memorial with relief as gateway arch, 1920s; whole complex with church and graveyard
- Village centre (monumental zone) – from Römerstraße to the Old School on Briederweg, along Abteistraße and Zehnthofstraße including church and graveyard
- cast-iron hand pump, late 19th century
- Abteistraße 6 – solid building, 17th or 18th century
- Abteistraße 7 – timber-frame house, partly solid, plastered, hipped roof, dendrochronologically dated to 1478/1479 and 1486, expansions in the 18th and early 20th centuries; addition; commercial building with mediaeval entrance; whole complex
- Abteistraße 8 – timber-frame house, partly solid, plastered, half-hipped roof, roof trusses about 1470/1480, conversion possibly in the 18th century
- Abteistraße/Römerstraße – barn, about 1480
- Briederner Weg – cast-iron hand pump, late 19th century
- Briederner Weg 1 – solid building, partly timber-frame, dendrochronologically dated to 1529/1530
- Briederner Weg 2 – cast-iron hand pump, late 19th century
- Briederner Weg 10 – old school; quarrystone building, 1886/1887
- Briederner Weg 11 – quarrystone house with sandstone window frames, marked 1898
- im Winkel 4 – timber-frame house, partly solid, 18th century
- Kehrstraße 6 – timber-frame house, roofed with Eternit, mansard roof, 18th century
- Kirchstraße 5 – solid building with timber-frame oriel, dendrochronologically dated to 1460 ± 5 years
- Kirchstraße 6 – former Brauweiler Hof, Brauweiler Monastery's tithing manor; representative building with half-hipped roof, Abbot Amandus Herriger's (1756-1778) coat of arms, about 1770, architect possibly Nikolaus Lauxen; Baroque figure of Saint Nicholas; winepress house, dendrochronologically dated to 1651
- Kirchstraße 7 – solid building, essentially late mediaeval, 15th century, timber-frame oriel, marked 1762
- Kirchstraße 8 – winepress house, partly timber-frame, about 1605/1606
- Kirchstraße 9 – solid building, dendrochronologically dated to 1542/1543, cellar portal marked 1605, timber-frame oriel from the 18th century
- Kirchstraße 10 – three-floor house, timber-frame upper floor marked 1737, essentially possibly older
- Kirchstraße 12 – three-floor timber-frame house, partly solid, dendrochronologically dated to 1478 ± 5 years, marked 1772
- Kochstraße 4 – solid building, dendrochronologically dated to 1485
- Raiffeisenstraße – timber-frame barn, partly solid, 18th or 19th century; relief, early 18th century
- Raiffeisenstraße 1 – cast-iron pump, late 19th century
- Römerstraße 1 – solid building, dendrochronologically dated to 1494/1544
- Römerstraße 7 – timber-frame house, partly solid, mansard roof, 18th century
- Römerstraße 9 – mansard roof building, 18th century
- Weinbergstraße – winepress house, quarrystone mansard roof building, 18th century
- Weinbergstraße 3 – timber-frame house, partly solid, balloon frame, possibly from the 16th century, cellar portal marked 1605
- Weinbergstraße 11 – quarrystone building, partly timber-frame, Moselle-style, 1910
- Weinbergstraße 13 – timber-frame house, partly solid, plastered, marked 1584, addition 1869, conversion 1934
- Weinbergstraße 14 – two-part timber-frame house, partly solid or plastered, 16th century, newer part from the 18th or 19th century; whole complex together with no. 16
- Weinbergstraße 16 – timber-frame house, partly solid, plastered, dendrochronologically dated to 1525; well; whole complex together with no. 14
- Weinbergstraße 18 – timber-frame house, partly solid, balloon frame, late 16th century
- Weinbergstraße 20 – cast-iron cross, late 19th century
- Zehnthofstraße – garden with wrought-iron pavilion, marked 1895
- Zehnthofstraße 2 – quarrystone building with half-hipped roof, mid 19th century
- Zehnthofstraße 4 – quarrystone building with timber-frame oriel, marked 1569
- Zehnthofstraße 5 – quarrystone building, early 19th century
- Before Zehnthofstraße 5 – cast-iron hand pump, late 19th century
- Zehnthofstraße 8 – quarrystone house, plastered, dendrochronologically dated to 1562, conversion in the 19th century; whole complex with garden
- Zehnthofstraße 13 – timber-frame house, partly solid, plastered, hipped mansard roof, dendrochronologically dated to 1737
- Zehnthofstraße 17 – see Kirchstraße 6
- Zehnthofstraße 18 – lintel, marked 1771
- Zehnthofstraße 21 – plastered building, marked 1926
- Weinbergskapelle (“Vineyard Chapel”) – Baroque quarrystone building
- On the other side of the Moselle, on Bundesstraße 49 – ruins of a factory, plastered building with middle risalto
- north of Mesenich – forest chapel, so-called Erdpfalzhäuschen
