= Dohr =

- Municipality
- Coat of arms

- Location of Dohr within Cochem-Zell district
- Interactive map of Dohr
- Location within Germany Location within Rhineland-Palatinate
- Coordinates: 50°7′37″N 7°6′57″E
- Country: Germany
- State: Rhineland-Palatinate
- District: Cochem-Zell
- Municipal assoc.: Cochem

Government
  - Mayor (2019–24): Anton Göbel

Area
  - Total: 5.03 km^{2} (1.94 sq mi)
- Elevation: 380 m (1,250 ft)

Population (2025-12-31)
  - Total: 614
  - Density: 122/km^{2} (316/sq mi)
- Time zone: UTC+01:00 (CET)
  - Summer (DST): UTC+02:00 (CEST)
- Postal codes: 56812
- Dialling codes: 02671
- Vehicle registration: COC

Dohr (German pronunciation: [doːɐ̯]) is an Ortsgemeinde – a municipality belonging to a Verbandsgemeinde, a kind of collective municipality – in the Cochem-Zell district in Rhineland-Palatinate, Germany. It belongs to the Verbandsgemeinde of Cochem, whose seat is in the like-named town.

== Geography ==
The municipality lies in the Eifel above Cochem, which can be reached easily over either Bundesstraße 259 or Kreisstraße 18. Dohr is one of the four municipalities in the Verbandsgemeinde of Cochem that sit up in the heights. Its area is 502 ha and it has 690 inhabitants whose main residence is in the municipality and another 52 who have a secondary residence there, for a total of 742 (as at 31 December 2009). Dohr is a commercial location.

== History ==
The name “Dohr” is derived from the Celtic Dunon, meaning “fortified hill”. Dohr had its first documentary mention about 1200. In 1210, Count Gerhard of Are was enfeoffed with “eine villa quae dicitur Dure juxta Cochem” (“an estate which is called Dure next to Cochem”) by Archbishop of Trier Johann I. About 1475 a chapel, the forerunner of today's church, was first mentioned as a branch of the Cochem parish church. In a visitation report from 1569, it was described as Capella in Doir.

The village's name was later changed once again to Dohor. There have been two great fires in Dohr's history. The first one struck in 1720, burning the whole village down. In 1852 came another blaze that almost led to the same fate. Little of the village was left afterwards. The two world wars, as well, took their toll on Dohr, as witnessed by the plaque near the church entrance and the warriors’ memorial before the church.

The overlordship was held by the Electorate of Trier until 1794 when the area was occupied by French Revolutionary troops. In 1815 Dohr was assigned to the Kingdom of Prussia at the Congress of Vienna. Since 1946, it has been part of the then newly founded state of Rhineland-Palatinate.

What had been a small agriculturally structured place with 16 houses in 1563 underwent development in leaps and bounds in the 1950s when the Büchel Airbase (Fliegerhorst Büchel) and the Dohrer Maschinenfabrik (engine factory). Reflecting this development are the rise in population from 238 in 1960 to 761 in 2006 and the attendant land and infrastructure development, which saw the building of a parish hall and a school and sport centre.

At the now renovated village centre stood the old bakehouse. In the lower area were two ovens. Housed in the upper area next to the church entrance was the fire brigade. The order in which the villagers got to use the bakehouse was drawn on the eve of baking day, when the villagers also shared news and gossiped about village life. The bakehouse therefore not only was used for baking, but also served as a village social centre. Together with the church it formed the village centre.

== Politics ==
=== Municipal council ===
The council is made up of 12 council members, who were elected by majority vote at the municipal election held on 7 June 2009, and the honorary mayor as chairman.

=== Mayor ===
Dohr's mayor is Anton Göbel.

=== Coat of arms ===
The municipality's arms might be described thus: Quarterly argent and gules a cross counterchanged, in dexter chief a waterwheel spoked of eight sable, in sinister chief an eagle displayed of the first, in dexter base a Celtic wall and in sinister base a Dohr church chalice motif of the third.

That last charge, of course, is hardly a standard one in either English or German heraldry. Nonetheless, it is a design drawn from the chalice used at Dohr's local church. The chalice was a gift to the chapel from the Pastor at Cochem in the 16th century. The other three charges relate to the village's history. The waterwheel stands for the old mill, which was shut down only in 1927 and now lies in ruins. It also refers to the village's status as an almost exclusively agricultural community until about 1960. The silver eagle is the heraldic device formerly borne by the Counts of Are, the local lords in the Middle Ages. The stylized “Celtic wall” refers not only to the village's beginnings, but also to its name's Celtic origin. Indeed, even the chalice motif is held to represent the village's history as a part of the parish of Cochem, given its history.

== Culture and sightseeing ==
=== Buildings ===
The following are listed buildings or sites in Rhineland-Palatinate’s Directory of Cultural Monuments:

- Kirchstraße: Saint Nicholas's Catholic Church (branch church; Filialkirche St. Nikolaus); aisleless church, 1780, west tower from 1853
- Beside Hauptstraße 41: well; quarrystone, 19th century
- Kirchstraße: basalt graveyard cross from 1844
