= Cochem (Verbandsgemeinde) =

- Verbandsgemeinde
- Location of Cochem within Cochem-Zell district
- Interactive map of Cochem
- Location within Germany Location within Rhineland-Palatinate
- Coordinates: 50°09′N 7°10′E
- Country: Germany
- State: Rhineland-Palatinate
- District: Cochem-Zell
- Seat: Cochem
- Subdivisions: 23 municipalities

Area
  - Total: 211.16 km^{2} (81.53 sq mi)

Population (2025-12-31)
  - Total: 19,013
  - Density: 90.041/km^{2} (233.20/sq mi)
- Time zone: UTC+01:00 (CET)
  - Summer (DST): UTC+02:00 (CEST)
- Website: www.vgcochem.de

Cochem (before 7 June 2009 Cochem-Land) is a Verbandsgemeinde ("collective municipality") in the district Cochem-Zell, in Rhineland-Palatinate, Germany. It is located around the town Cochem (also part of the Verbandsgemeinde since 7 June 2009), which is the seat of the Verbandsgemeinde. On 1 July 2014 it was expanded with 6 municipalities from the former Verbandsgemeinde Treis-Karden. Since the 1 March 2018 Wolfgang Lambertz is the mayor of the Verbandsgemeinde Cochem.

Cochem consists of the following Ortsgemeinden ("local municipalities"):

1. Beilstein
2. Bremm
3. Briedern
4. Bruttig-Fankel
5. Cochem
6. Dohr
7. Ediger-Eller
8. Ellenz-Poltersdorf
9. Ernst
10. Faid
11. Greimersburg
12. Klotten
13. Lieg
14. Lütz
15. Mesenich
16. Moselkern
17. Müden (Mosel)
18. Nehren
19. Pommern
20. Senheim
21. Treis-Karden
22. Valwig
23. Wirfus
