= Ernst, Germany =

Ernst
- Municipality
- Coat of arms

- Location of Ernst within Cochem-Zell district
- Interactive map of Ernst
- Location within Germany Location within Rhineland-Palatinate
- Coordinates: 50°8′41″N 7°13′31″E
- Country: Germany
- State: Rhineland-Palatinate
- District: Cochem-Zell
- Municipal assoc.: Cochem

Government
  - Mayor (2019–24): Bernd Schüller

Area
  - Total: 4.18 km^{2} (1.61 sq mi)
- Elevation: 90 m (300 ft)

Population (2025-12-31)
  - Total: 562
  - Density: 134/km^{2} (348/sq mi)
- Time zone: UTC+01:00 (CET)
  - Summer (DST): UTC+02:00 (CEST)
- Postal codes: 56814
- Dialling codes: 02671
- Vehicle registration: COC
- Website: www.ernst-mosel.de

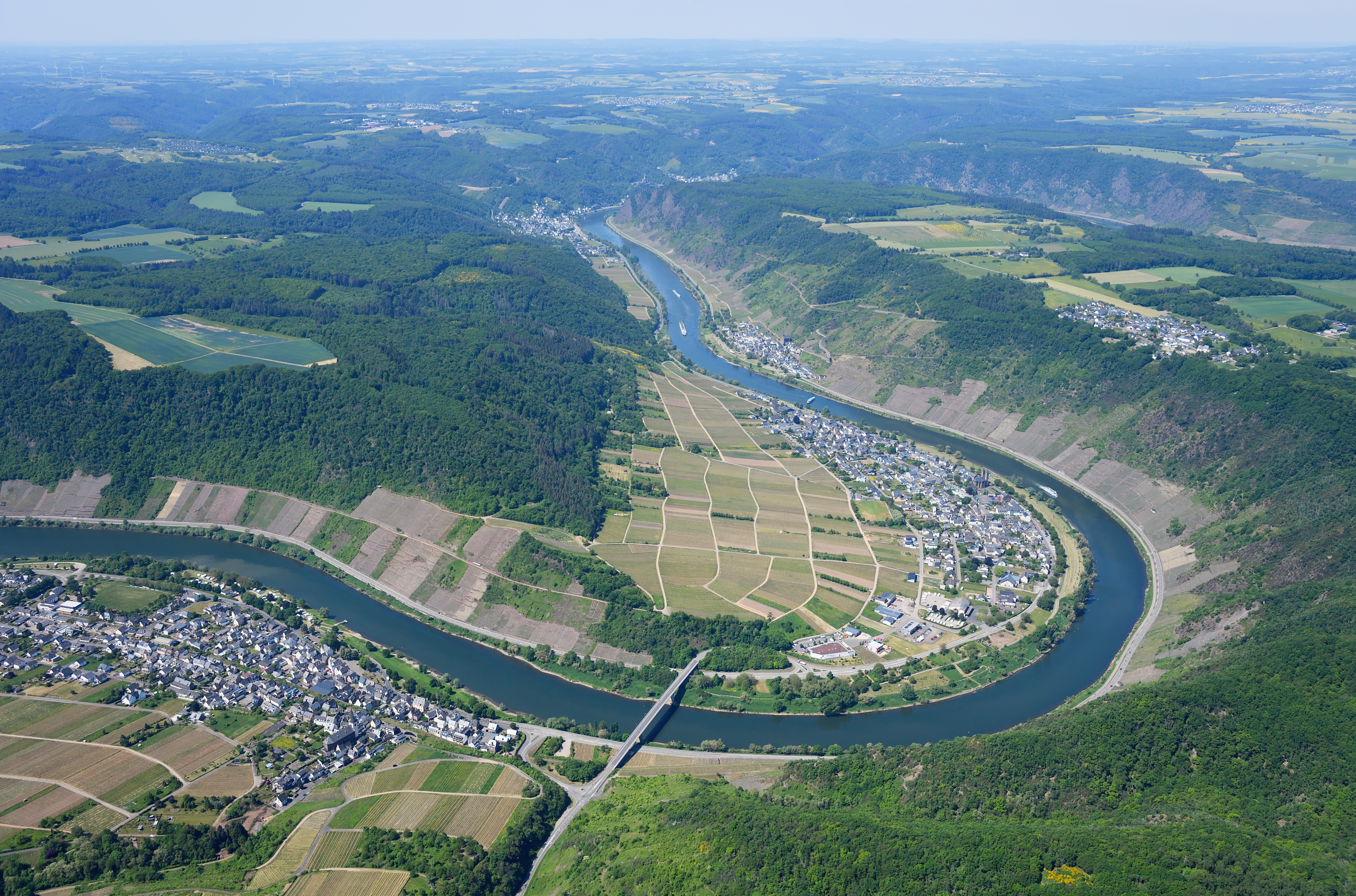
Aerial view of Ernst

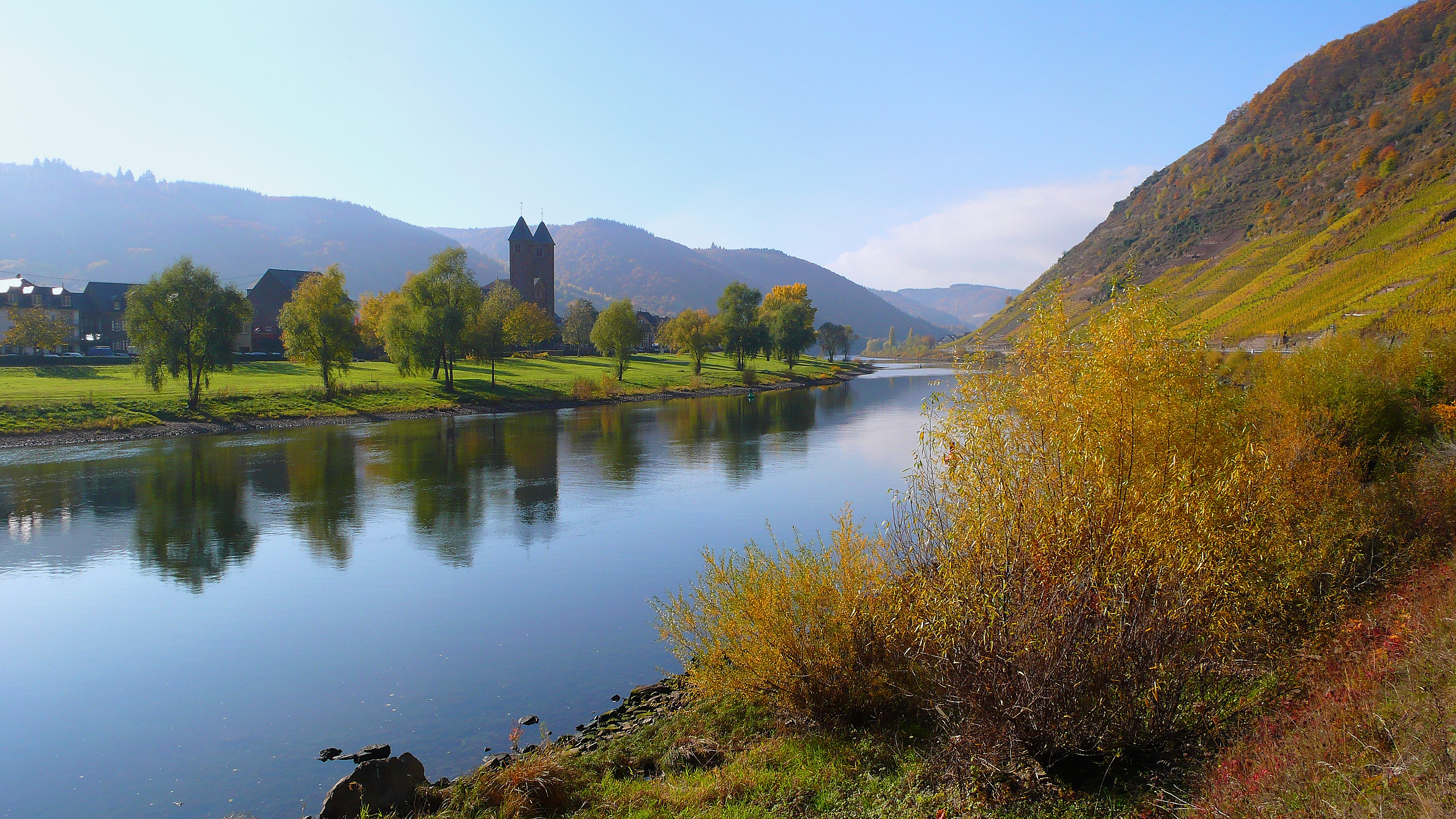
View of Ernst across the Moselle from the right bank

Ernst is an Ortsgemeinde – a municipality belonging to a Verbandsgemeinde, a kind of collective municipality – in the Cochem-Zell district in Rhineland-Palatinate, Germany. The winegrowing centre belongs to the Verbandsgemeinde of Cochem, whose seat is in the like-named town.

== Geography ==
=== Location ===
The municipality lies in a bow in the river Moselle only 4 km from Cochem, going towards Trier. Over on the other side of the Moselle lies Valwig. Ernst's municipal area comprises 418 ha, of which 90 ha is vineyards and 227 ha is wooded. Ernst has 617 inhabitants who maintain their main residence in the municipality and another 40 who have a secondary residence there.

=== Constituent communities ===
Ernst's Ortsteile are Oberernst and Unterernst.

== History ==
A grain grater from La Tène times may well be evidence that Ernst was already settled by 250 BC, and that it is therefore of Celtic origin. Even the earliest documentary mention of Ernst as Arnesche shows the village's Celtic beginnings. In AD 670, “Hilduin” bequeathed vineyards in Ernst to his brother-in-law. Ernst was made up of two constituent centres then, Oberernst and Niederernst, but was always a unified municipality. In the Middle Ages, lower court jurisdiction was exercised through the Valwig-Ernst court. When Ernst passed along with the Rhineland to Prussia, the Prussian government decreed that Oberernst, where the parish church and the old town hall stood, and Niederernst were to grow together into one centre, a project that, as can be seen today, was at least successful on the road alongside the Moselle, if nowhere else.

The municipality as it stands today takes its shape mainly from the building of the church and the laying out of the Moselstraße – the road alongside the Moselle – in the mid 19th century. Ernst has been a winegrowing centre for 2,000 years, with 14 full-time winemakers still at the trade today and another 10 who undertake it as a secondary occupation.

The landholder until the French Revolutionary occupation in 1794 was the Electorate of Trier. In 1815 both centres were assigned to the Kingdom of Prussia at the Congress of Vienna. Not long thereafter, they were merged to form one municipality. Since 1946, it has been part of the then newly founded state of Rhineland-Palatinate.

== Politics ==
=== Municipal council ===
The council is made up of 12 council members, who were elected by majority vote at the municipal election held on 7 June 2009, and the honorary mayor as chairwoman.

=== Mayor ===
Ernst's mayor is Bernd Schüller.

=== Coat of arms ===
The German blazon reads: Von Silber und Grün gespalten. In Silber ein rotes Balkenkreuz, in Grün 9 (2:1, 2:1, 2:1) goldene Kugeln.

The municipality's arms might in English heraldic language be described thus: Per pale argent a cross gules and vert nine bezants, two, one, two, one, two and one.

Ernst belonged until the late 18th century to the Electorate of Trier, hence the Electoral-Trier cross on the dexter (armsbearer's right, viewer's left) side. Saint Quirinus bore nine balls (called Kugeln in the German blazon and translated “bezants” in the English blazon – the closest standard charge in English heraldry) in his arms, and was also the patron of the church in Niederernst. His attribute now appears on the sinister (armsbearer's left, viewer's right) side of Ernst's arms. The arms were designed by Decku in Sankt Wendel (Saarland).

== Culture and sightseeing ==
=== Buildings ===
The following are listed buildings or sites in Rhineland-Palatinate’s Directory of Cultural Monuments:

- Holy Saviour's Catholic Church (Katholische Kirche St. Salvator), Moselstraße 48 – cross-in-square church with twin-tower façade, 1844-1848, architect Johann Claudius von Lassaulx; outside, five gravestones, 19th century; whole complex with graveyard
- Auf der Winneburg 29/31 – double house; timber-frame house, partly solid, dendrochronologically dated to 1503/1504; timber-frame house, partly solid, from 1578
- Before Fährstraße 2 – timber-frame house, partly solid, essentially from the 16th or 17th century, expanded in the 18th century, in two parts, back part with high ground floor, far-jutting upper floor, curved braces; front part likewise timber-frame upper floor with yoke braces, half-hipped roof; whole complex with garden with pavilion
- Fährstraße 9 – portal, from 1772
- Fährstraße 11 – timber-frame house, partly solid, mansard roof, 16th century, roof conversion in the 18th century; towards the back quarrystone building with Late Gothic portal
- Fährstraße 40 –
- Herrenstraße 5 – quarrystone building, plastered, late 18th century
- Herrenstraße 14 – timber-frame house, partly solid, 16th century
- Kleinstraße 3 – fountain
- Klosterstraße 5 – Baroque Revival winemaker's house, about 1900/1910
- Klosterstraße 11 – two-winged timber-frame house, partly plastered, from 1779
- Moselstraße – Heiligenhäuschen (a small, shrinelike structure consecrated to a saint or saints), 1850; cross, from 1663; grave cross, from 1762
- Moselstraße 30 – timber-frame house, partly solid, plastered, hipped mansard roof, 18th century
- Moselstraße 38 – building with half-hipped roof, quarrystone, from 1901
- Moselstraße 46 – former school; quarrystone building, about 1845; basalt wayside cross, from 1616; new school; mansard roof, 1913; whole complex
- Moselstraße/corner of Weingartenstraße – Heiligenhäuschen; relief, from 1686
- Weingartenstraße – basalt wayside cross
- Weingartenstraße 24 – basalt wayside cross, from 1777
- Weingartenstraße 24 – well with well house
- Weingartenstraße 24 – quarrystone house, mid 19th century
- Weingartenstraße 74 – well, 18th century
- Weingartenstraße 75a – solid building, essentially possibly from the 16th century
- Weingartenstraße 81 – solid building, half-hipped roof, from 1832; towards the back timber-frame house, plastered, considerably older
- Weingartenstraße/corner of Herrenstraße – late mediaeval sandstone portal, from (15)48
- Weingartenstraße/corner of Fährstraße – well with well house
- Weingartenstraße/corner of Herrenstraße – Heiligenhäuschen, within, a Baroque Madonna (copy?), 18th century
- On Bundesstraße 49, going towards Cochem – basalt wayside cross, from 1603
- On Bundesstraße 49, going towards Cochem – basalt wayside cross, from 1633
- Kreuzkapelle (“Cross Chapel”) – plastered building, about 1709

The St. Salvator parish church with its twin towers, built in 1845 in Romanesque Revival style with Rhenish slate, is Ernst's foremost landmark.

== Economy and infrastructure ==
=== Transport ===
Bundesstraße 49 runs by the village, and Autobahn A 48 can be reached over either Landesstraße (State Road) 98 or Bundesstraße 259.

== Sundry ==
In 2005, Ernst was a winner in the contest Unser Dorf hat Zukunft (“Our village has a future”).
