= Klotten =

- Municipality
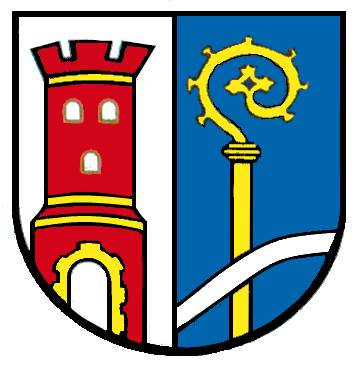
- Coat of arms

- Location of Klotten within Cochem-Zell district
- Interactive map of Klotten
- Location within Germany Location within Rhineland-Palatinate
- Coordinates: 50°10′00″N 7°11′59″E
- Country: Germany
- State: Rhineland-Palatinate
- District: Cochem-Zell
- Municipal assoc.: Cochem

Government
  - Mayor (2023–24): Uli Oster

Area
  - Total: 16.04 km^{2} (6.19 sq mi)
- Elevation: 110 m (360 ft)

Population (2025-12-31)
  - Total: 1,206
  - Density: 75.19/km^{2} (194.7/sq mi)
- Time zone: UTC+01:00 (CET)
  - Summer (DST): UTC+02:00 (CEST)
- Postal codes: 56818
- Dialling codes: 02671
- Vehicle registration: COC
- Website: www.klotten.de

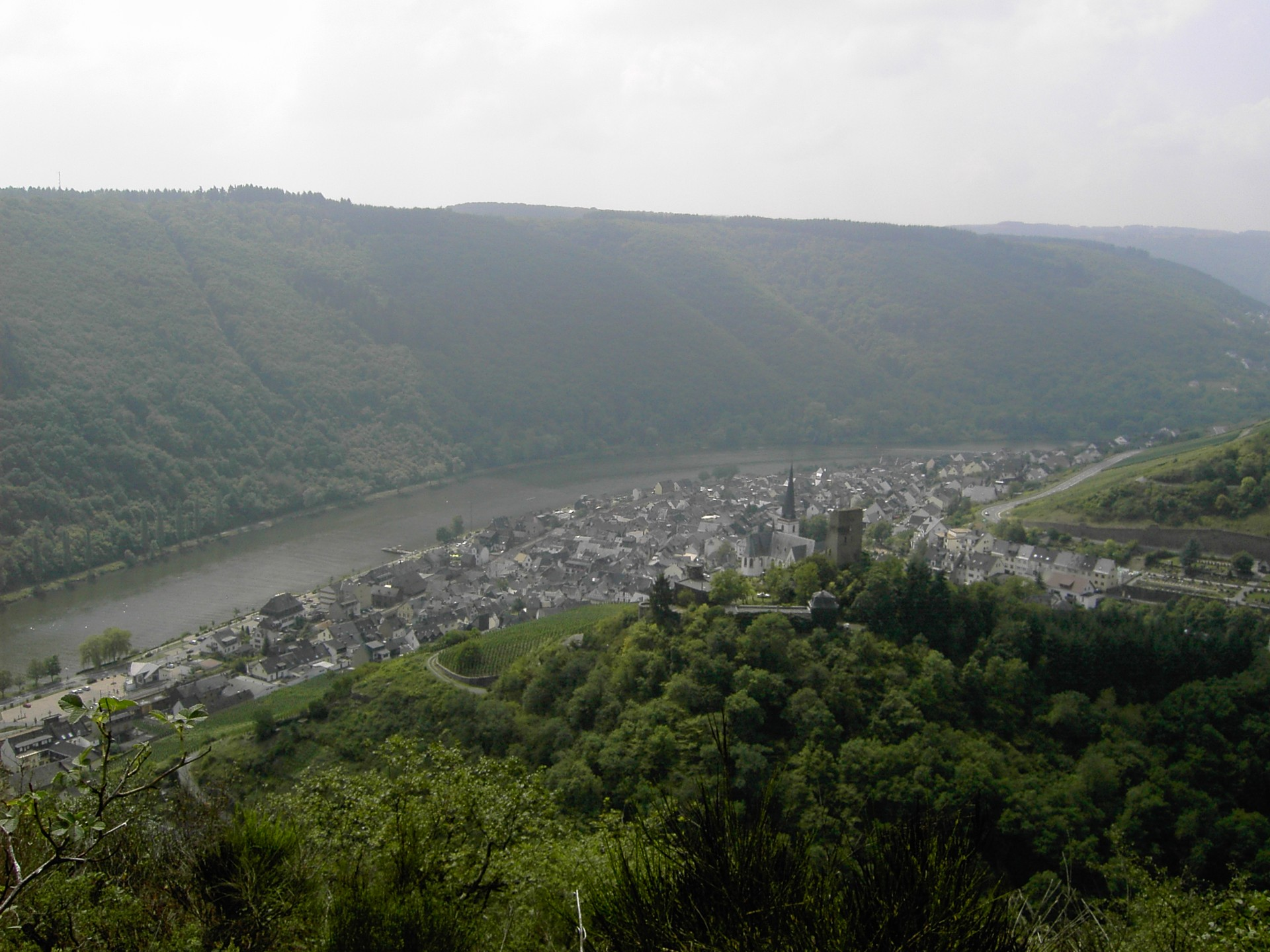
Klotten

Klotten (German pronunciation: [ˈklɔtn̩]) is an Ortsgemeinde – a municipality belonging to a Verbandsgemeinde, a kind of collective municipality – in the Cochem-Zell district in Rhineland-Palatinate, Germany. It belongs to the Verbandsgemeinde of Cochem, whose seat is in the like-named town. It is a winemaking centre.

== Geography ==
The municipality lies on the river Moselle and is surrounded by steep slate slopes. Vineyards in Klotten include Burg Coraidelstein, Brauneberg and Rosenberg.

== History ==
In 698, Klotten had its first documentary mention. The Polish queen Richeza, Count Palatine Ezzo's daughter and Emperor Otto II's granddaughter, quite probably stayed with her three children between 1040 and 1049 in Klotten, where she had herself built a chapel (Nikolauskirche, or Saint Nicholas's Church) and a dwelling tower, which was linked by a bridge to the chapel. Upon her death on 21 March 1063, she bequeathed all that she owned to the Brauweiler Benedictine Abbey near Cologne. Her sarcophagus stands today in Cologne Cathedral, to the left below the High Altar, the "Epiphany Shrine".

Electoral-Trier overlordship ended with the French Revolutionary occupation of the Rhine's left bank between 1794 and 1796. In 1814 Klotten was assigned to the Kingdom of Prussia at the Congress of Vienna. Since 1946, it has been part of the then newly founded state of Rhineland-Palatinate.

== Politics ==
=== Municipal council ===
The council is made up of 16 council members, who were elected at the municipal election held on 26 May 2019, and the honorary mayor as chairman.

The municipal election held on 26 May 2019 yielded the following results:

	SPD	CDU	FWG	Total
2019	—	7	9	16 seats
2014	—	7	9	16 seats
2009	1	6	9	16 seats
2004	2	5	9	16 seats

=== Mayor ===
Klotten's mayor is Uli Oster.

=== Coat of arms ===
The German blazon reads: Von Silber und Blau gespalten. Vorn in Silber ein roter Torturm mit 3 Zinnen, offenem Tor und 3 (2:1) offenen Fenstern. In Blau ein aus dem Schildfuß wachsender goldener Bischofsstab mit Krümme nach außen, darunter im Schildfuß ein schräglinkes, silbernes Wellenbad.

The municipality's arms might in English heraldic language be described thus: Per pale argent issuant from base a gate tower embattled of three gules with three windows and gate of the field, and azure issuant from base a bishop's staff sinister Or surmounted in base by a bendlet sinister wavy of the first.

The arms were designed by Decku of Sankt Wendel and A. Friderichs of Zell.

=== Town partnerships ===
Klotten fosters partnerships with the following places:

- Berlaimont, Nord, France since 1972

== Culture and sightseeing ==
=== Buildings ===
The following are listed buildings or sites in Rhineland-Palatinate’s Directory of Cultural Monuments:

- Burg Coraidelstein (monumental zone) – castle apparently founded by Count Palatine Herman I (last mentioned in 996), important expansion in 1338, “new structure on the fortifications at Klotten” built in 1545, never destroyed, sold for demolition in 1830; still preserved: essentially Romanesque keep with Gothic casing, castle house with round tower, side building (in the southeast a manor house built in 1543–1547 with remnants of three round towers), villa from 1905, renovated in 1955
- Am Mühlenberg – wayside chapel, 17th century; niche cross, 17th century; basalt wayside cross, from 1683
- Bahnhofstraße – railway station; one-floor quarrystone building, partly timber-frame, early 20th century
- Bahnhofstraße 6 – timber-frame house, partly solid, plastered and slated, half-hipped roof, 16th century
- Bahnhofstraße 9 – timber-frame house, partly solid, balloon frame, 16th century
- Bahnhoftstraße 13 – wayside cross; niche cross, from 1646
- Brauweiler Platz – stone with abbot's staff
- Across the street from Fahrstraße 8 – relief, stone with abbot's staff
- Fahrstraße 8 – Gothic solid building, 16th century, back wall partly timber-frame
- Hauptstraße 19 – Gothic Revival chapel, 19th century
- Hauptstraße 26 – school; quarrystone building, from 1907
- Hauptstraße 56 – sculpture of Saint Nicholas, 19th century
- Hauptstraße 69 – three-floor timber-frame house, partly solid, from 1588
- Hauptstraße 72 – timber-frame house, partly solid, plastered, about 1600
- Hauptstraße 75 – former Malmedyer Hof, manor of Brauweiler Abbey; three-floor timber-frame house, partly solid, 16th century, spire light from the 19th century
- Hauptstraße 80 – timber-frame house, partly solid, from 1632; hearth heating plate, 18th century
- Hauptstraße 89/91 – quarrystone double house, from 1896
- Hauptstraße 101 – three-floor timber-frame house, from 1545
- Hauptstraße 102/103 – three-floor timber-frame house, partly solid, from 1545; fountain, from 1463 (or 1863 – inscription unclear)
- Hauptstraße 104 – three-floor timber-frame house, partly solid, plastered, half-hipped roof, from 1583, 1585 and 1664
- Hohlstraße 4 – timber-frame house, partly solid or sided, possibly from the 16th or 17th century
- Hohlstraße 20 – Moselle winemaker's house; quarrystone building, 19th century
- Hohlstraße/corner of Schulstraße – handpump, 19th century
- Kernstraße/corner of Hauptstraße – wayside cross, from 1772
- Martinstraße 3 – portal, from 1776
- Mittelstraße – Bildstock; solid, plastered, roughly 2.5 m tall, big niche, about 1800
- Mittelstraße 48 – timber-frame house, plastered, 17th century
- Mittelstraße 52 – Moselle winemaker's house; big quarrystone building, from 1871
- Mittelstraße 57 – three-floor timber-frame house, partly solid, plastered and slated, from 1621
- Mittelstraße 58 – timber-frame house, partly solid, half-hipped roof, 16th or 17th century
- Moselstraße – wayside chapel; grave cross fragment; wayside cross, from 1698
- Moselstraße 6 – quarrystone Moselle winemaker's house, about 1850
- Moselstraße 11 – winemaker's villa; three-floor quarrystone building with half-hipped roof
- Moselstraße 16 – winemaking estate; big quarrystone building, 19th century
- Obere Kirchstraße – wayside cross, from 1809
- Obere Kirchstraße – sandstone wayside cross; 17th/18th century
- Obere Kirchstraße 6 – two-winged timber-frame house; three-floor part, balloon frame, from 1524, two-floor part, 17th century
- Obere Kirchstraße 15 – former rectory; three-floor timber-frame house, partly solid, 17th century; plastered building, partly timber-frame, built onto it, 1901
- Obere Kirchstraße 16 – Alte Post; Late Historicist plastered building, sided, about 1900
- Obere Kirchstraße/corner of Brühlstraße – wayside chapel, 19th century; niche cross, from 1599
- Reuschelstraße 6/7 – two timber-frame houses, partly solid, about 1700, shed; whole complex
- Schulstraße – Saint Maximin's Catholic Parish Church (Pfarrkirche St. Maximin); Romanesque west tower, built higher in 1564, originally twin-naved, south chapel from the 16th century, in 1868 remodelled into an entrance hall while nave was expanded into a three-naved hall church; bronze door boss, 12th century; at the graveyard 42 grave crosses, earliest from 1507; tomb, 19th century; Late Gothic stone cross, earlier half of the 15th century; warriors’ memorial; Crucifixion group, 19th century; whole complex with old graveyard and rectory
- Schulstraße – wayside cross, from 1657
- Schulstraße 3 – former tithing house; quarrystone building, partly timber-frame, 18th century
- Schulstraße 4 – door lintel with engravings, about 1050
- Jewish graveyard – 14 gravestones, oldest from 1878
- Chapel with Way of the Cross – aisleless church with timber-frame porch; two crosses, from 1637 and 1679; grave cross, 18th century; Way of the Cross, steles with reliefs, late 19th or early 20th century
- Kavelocherhof – chapel with relief, Trinity relief, 18th century
- Way of the Cross – steles with reliefs
- Northwest of Klotten – wayside crosses, niche cross, from 1652; two cross fragments
- Above Klotten – Seitskapelle; vineyard chapel, two-part building; Gothic Revival Christ figure
- Below the castle – Way of the Cross, reliefs, 20th century

Since 2002, Saint Maximin's Church has housed a reliquary of Polish queen Richeza.

=== Other sites ===
Nearby on the Moselle heights is found the Klotten Wilderness and Leisure Park (Wild- und Freizeitpark Klotten). Also worth seeing is the Dortebachtal Nature Conservation Area (Naturschutzgebiet Dortebachtal).

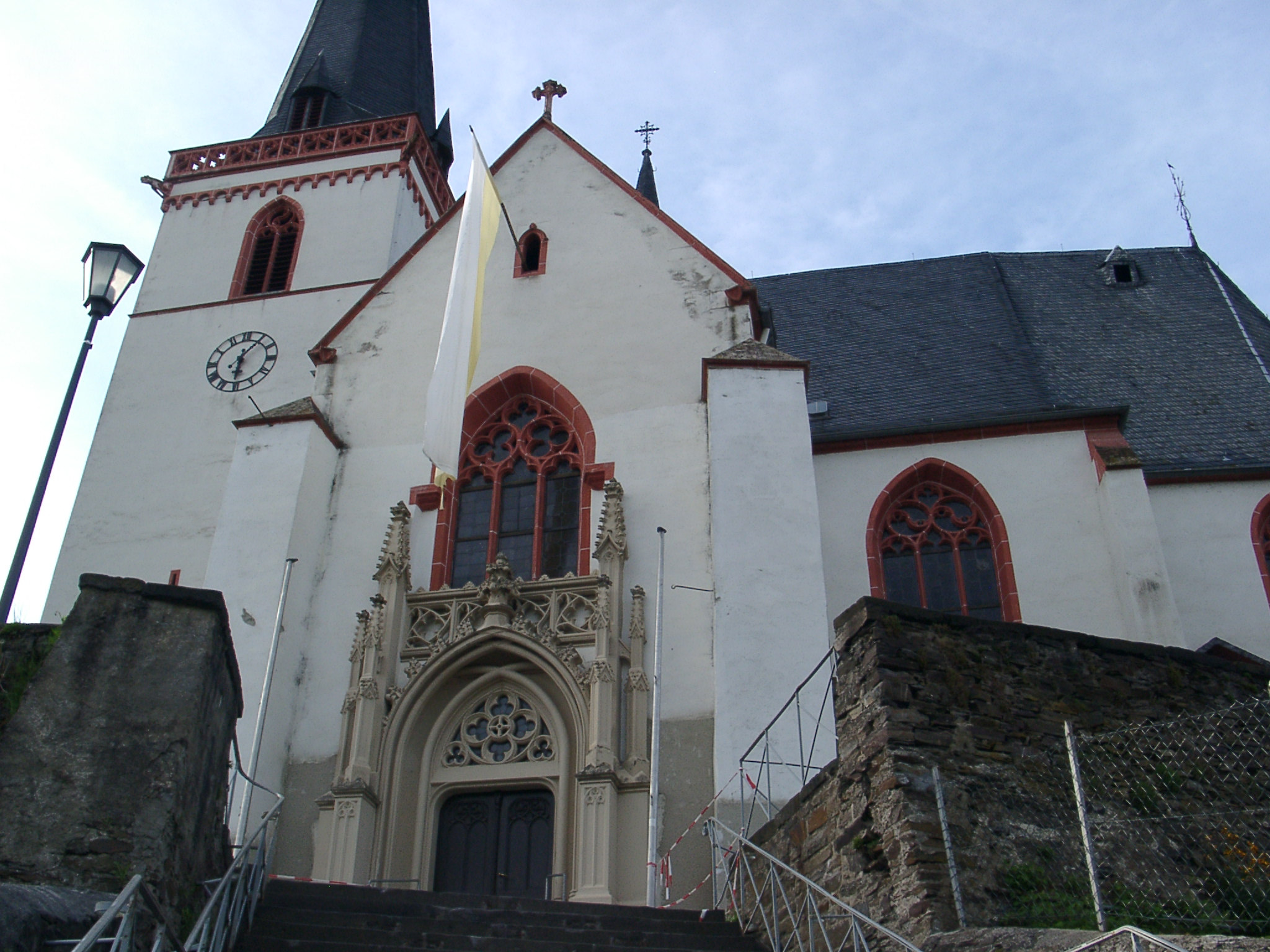
Parish Church

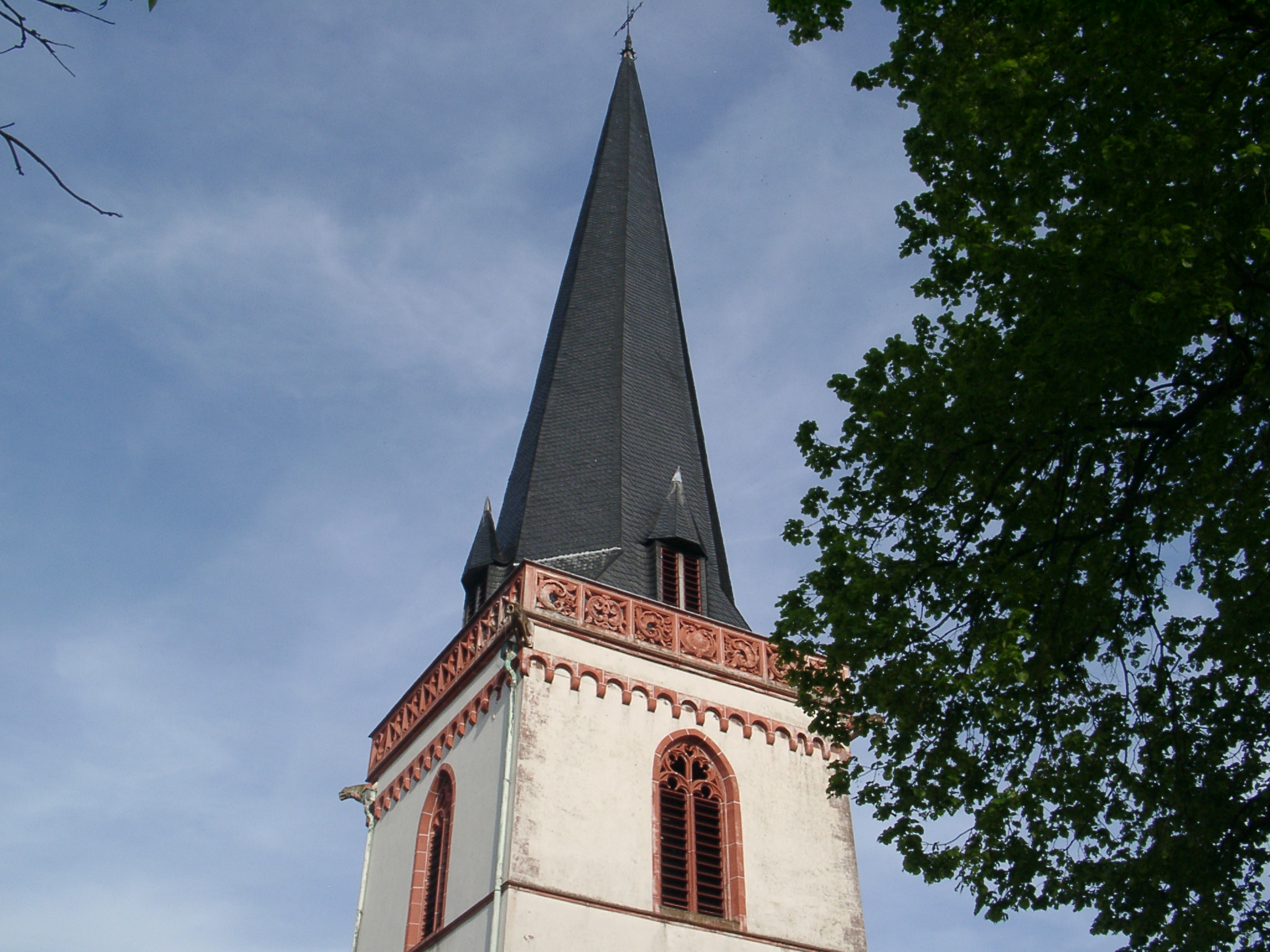
Steeple

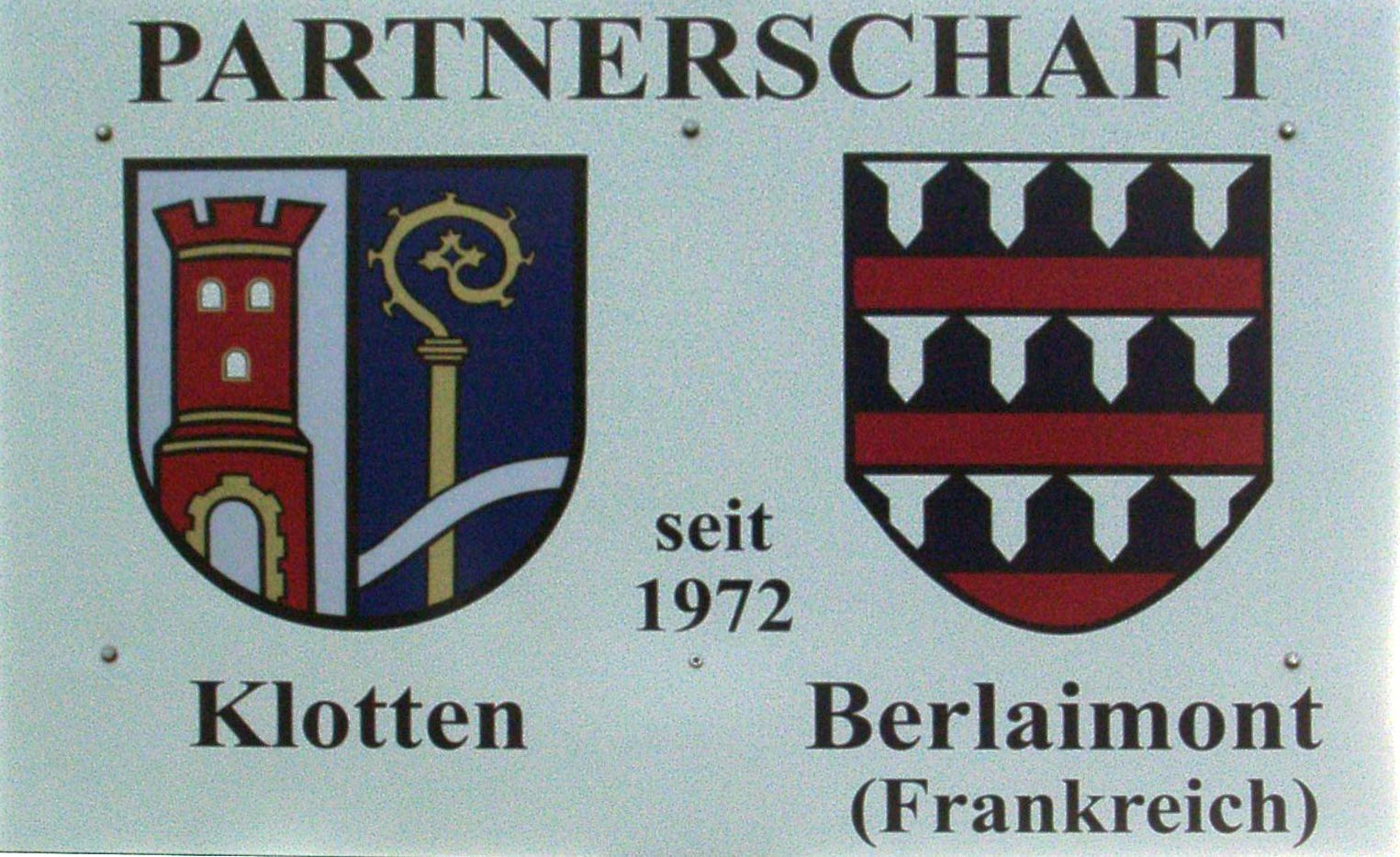
Plaque with Klotten's and partner municipality Berlaimont's coats of arms

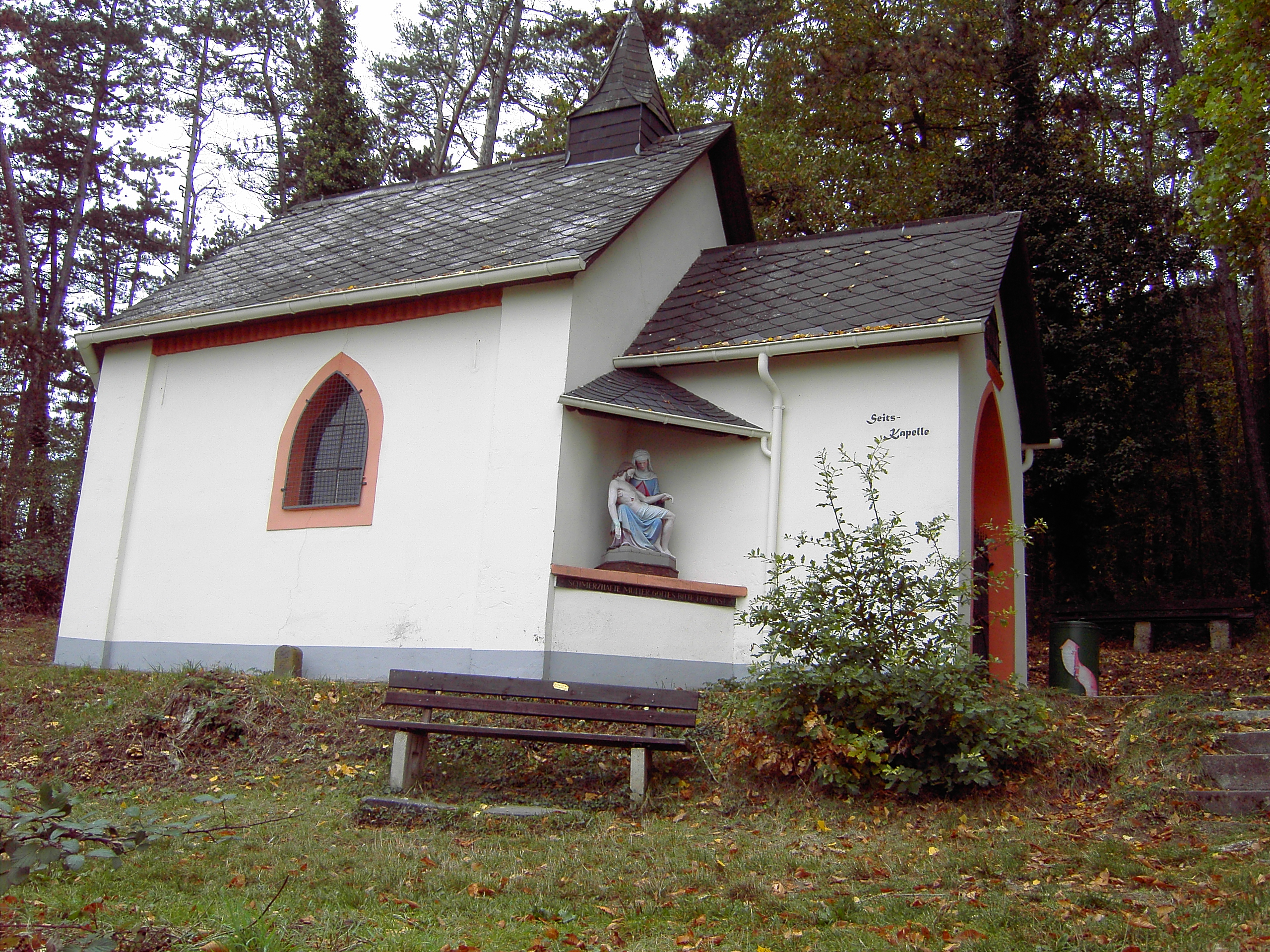
Above Klotten: Seitskapelle
