= Nehren, Rhineland-Palatinate =

Nehren
- Municipality
- Coat of arms

- Location of Nehren within Cochem-Zell district
- Interactive map of Nehren
- Location within Germany Location within Rhineland-Palatinate
- Coordinates: 50°5′5″N 7°11′51″E
- Country: Germany
- State: Rhineland-Palatinate
- District: Cochem-Zell
- Municipal assoc.: Cochem

Government
  - Mayor (2019–24): Frank Liebfried

Area
  - Total: 0.76 km^{2} (0.29 sq mi)
- Elevation: 91 m (299 ft)

Population (2025-12-31)
  - Total: 114
  - Density: 150/km^{2} (390/sq mi)
- Time zone: UTC+01:00 (CET)
  - Summer (DST): UTC+02:00 (CEST)
- Postal codes: 56820
- Dialling codes: 02673
- Vehicle registration: COC

Nehren (German pronunciation: [ˈneːʁən]) is an Ortsgemeinde – a municipality belonging to a Verbandsgemeinde, a kind of collective municipality – in the Cochem-Zell district in Rhineland-Palatinate, Germany. It belongs to the Verbandsgemeinde of Cochem, whose seat is in the like-named town. Nehren is a winegrowing centre.

== Geography ==
The municipality lies at the south end of a long vineyard-covered ridge behind an old arm of the river Moselle.

== History ==
In 634, Nehren had its first documentary mention. It arose from the Roman settlement Villa Nogeria. Beginning in 1814, it was part of Prussia’s Rhine Province, and since 1946, it has been part of the then newly founded state of Rhineland-Palatinate.

== Politics ==
=== Municipal council ===
The council is made up of 6 council members, who were elected by majority vote at the municipal election held on 7 June 2009, and the honorary mayor as chairman.

=== Mayor ===
Nehren's mayor is Frank Liebfried.

=== Coat of arms ===
The German blazon reads: Im grünen Feld stilisierte römische Grabkammern in Gold.

The municipality's arms might in English heraldic language be described thus: Vert two stylized Roman tombs Or.

The arms were designed by A. Friderichs of Zell.

== Culture and sightseeing ==
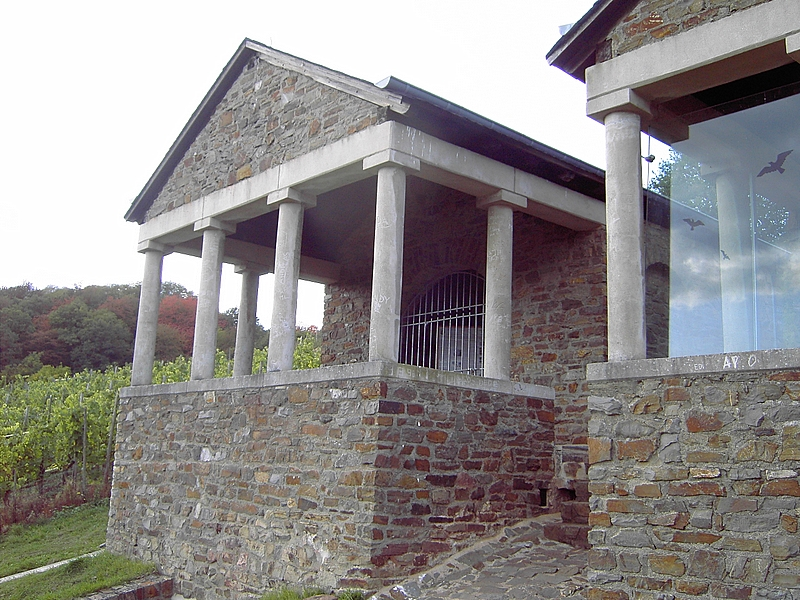
Antentempel

=== Buildings ===
The following are listed buildings or sites in Rhineland-Palatinate’s Directory of Cultural Monuments:

- Saint Agatha's Catholic Church (branch church; Filialkirche St. Agatha), Kirchstraße 24 – small irregular building, possibly partly still Romanesque in its walls; triaxial aisleless church and tower, second fourth of the 16th century; whole complex of church with walled graveyard
- So-called Antentempel – Roman grave of Nehren, reconstructions of a Roman tomb done in 1973/1974

=== Other sites ===
Although not a listed site, a Roman winepressing stone is also to be found in Nehren on the village square.
