= Spire light =

English architectural term

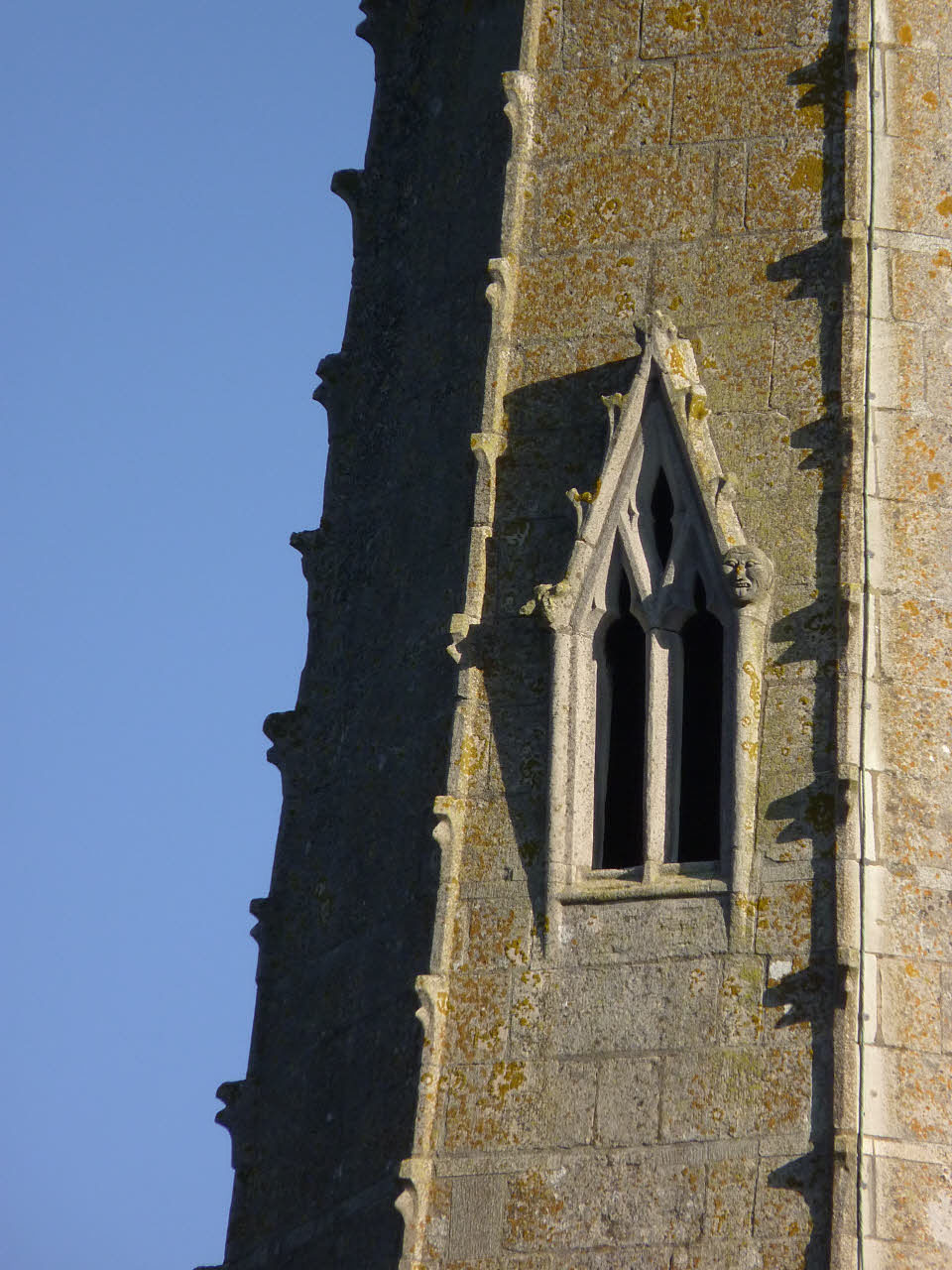
Lucarne on the church spire of St Botolph's Church, Ratcliffe on the Wreake, England

Spire light (Fr. lucarne), the term given to the windows in a spire which are found in all periods of English Gothic architecture, and in French spires form a very important feature in the composition.

There is an early example in the spire of the cathedral at Oxford; they are not glazed, and have occasionally, if of large size, transoms to strengthen the mullions.

The term lucarne is used in France to mean "dormer window", and in the United Kingdom to mean a spire light. They take many different forms which distinguishes the form of small roof above the window: "à chevalet" (straight lucarne), lucarne avec saillie and lucarne "à la capucine" (or with receding roof).
