= Bruttig-Fankel =

- Municipality
- Coat of arms

- Location of Bruttig-Fankel within Cochem-Zell district
- Interactive map of Bruttig-Fankel
- Location within Germany Location within Rhineland-Palatinate
- Coordinates: 50°7′53″N 7°13′54″E
- Country: Germany
- State: Rhineland-Palatinate
- District: Cochem-Zell
- Municipal assoc.: Cochem
- Subdivisions: 2

Government
  - Mayor (2019–24): Rainer Welches

Area
  - Total: 14.38 km^{2} (5.55 sq mi)
- Elevation: 85 m (279 ft)

Population (2025-12-31)
  - Total: 1,130
  - Density: 78.6/km^{2} (204/sq mi)
- Time zone: UTC+01:00 (CET)
  - Summer (DST): UTC+02:00 (CEST)
- Postal codes: 56814
- Dialling codes: 02671
- Vehicle registration: COC
- Website: www.bruttig-fankel.de

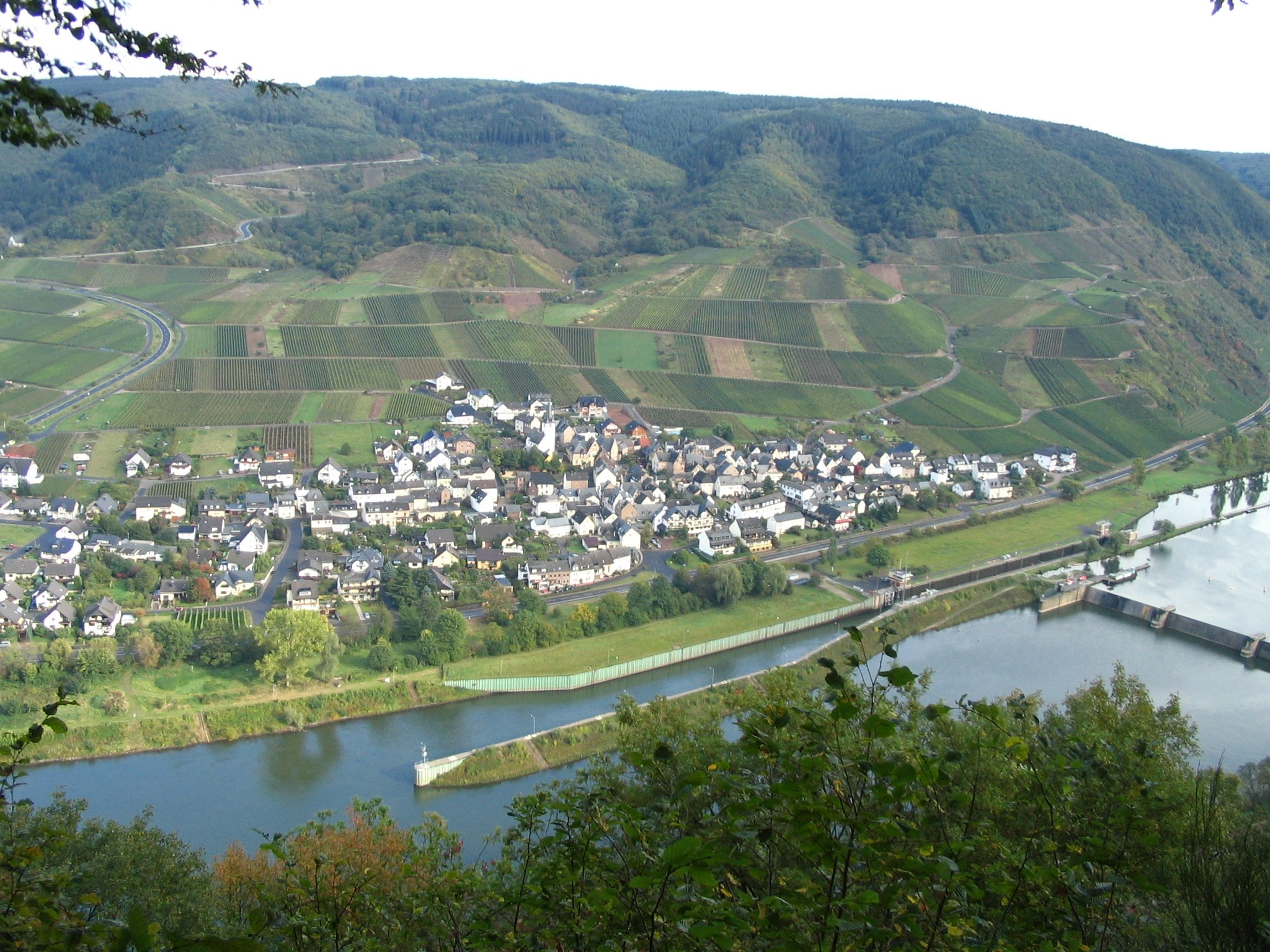
Bruttig-Fankel on the Moselle; constituent community of Fankel with the Moselle lock

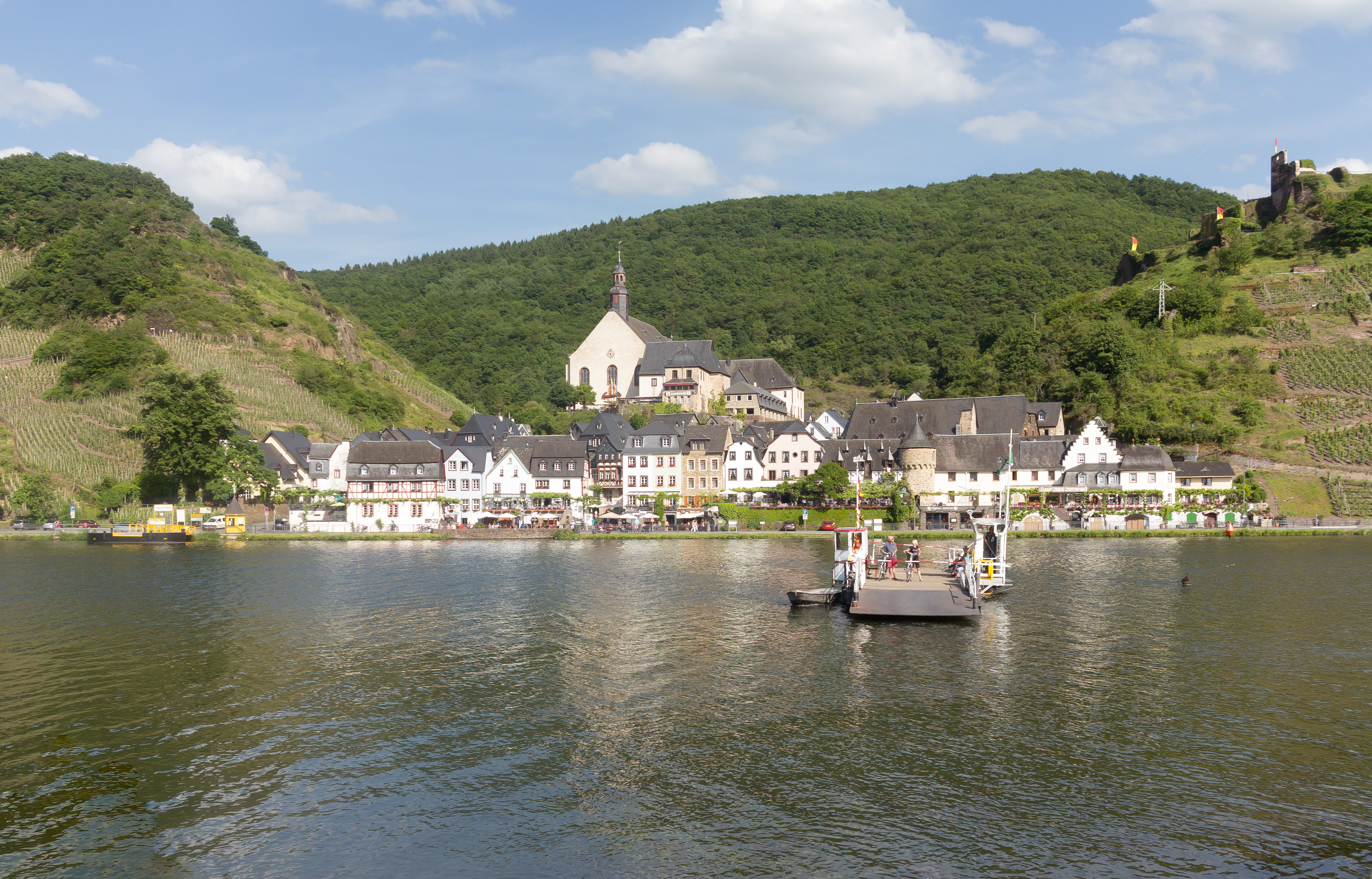
Bruttig-Fankel, view to the village

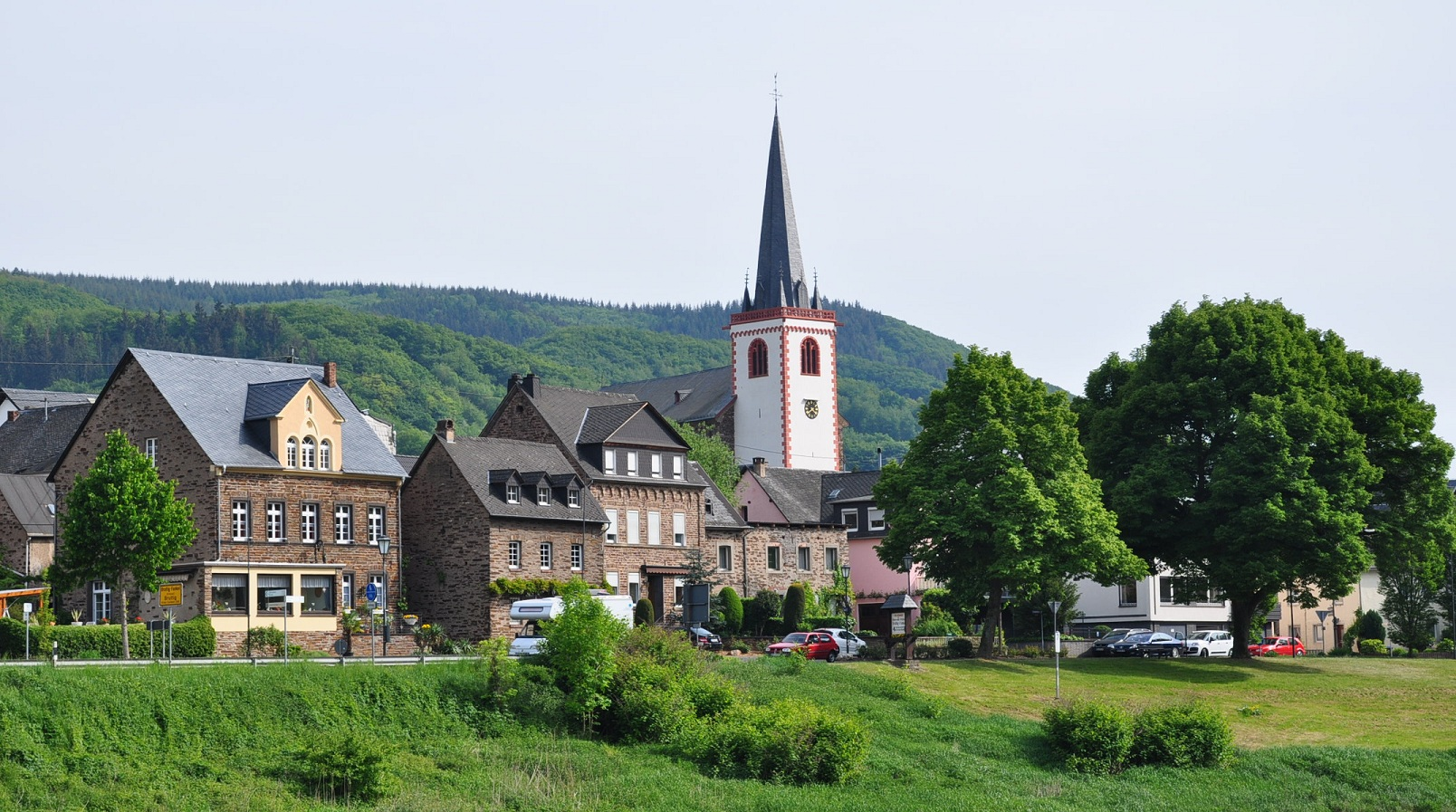
Bruttig: Moselle riverfront

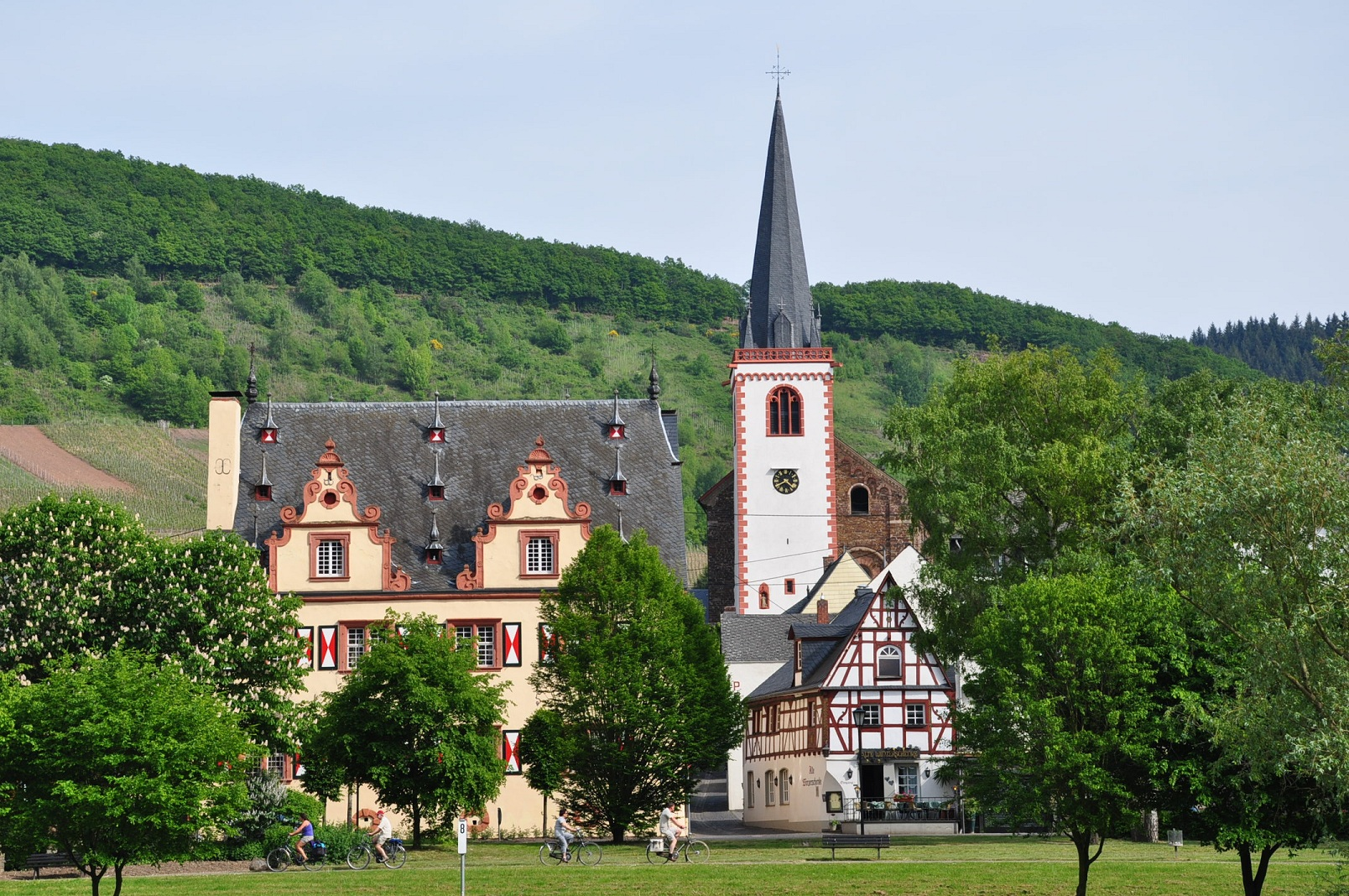
Bruttig, church

Bruttig-Fankel is an Ortsgemeinde – a municipality belonging to a Verbandsgemeinde, a kind of collective municipality – in the Cochem-Zell district in Rhineland-Palatinate, Germany. It belongs to the Verbandsgemeinde of Cochem, whose seat is in the like-named town.

== Geography ==
=== Location ===
The municipality lies on the river Moselle (kilometres 57–59; Lower Moselle) and, as the name suggests, is made up of the two constituent communities of Bruttig and Fankel.

=== Climate ===
Yearly precipitation in Bruttig-Fankel amounts to 716 mm, which falls into the middle third of the precipitation chart for all Germany. Only at 43% of the German Weather Service's weather stations are lower figures recorded. The driest month is February. The most rainfall comes in June. In that month, precipitation is 1.8 times what it is in February. Precipitation varies moderately. At 46% of the weather stations, lower seasonal swings are recorded.

== History ==
The oldest evidence of settlers in the area is the very well preserved barrows on the Bruttig-Fankeler Berg (the local mountain) along the so-called Rennweg, an old linking road between the Roman long-distance roads, over which today runs the “Archaeological Hiking Trail” (Archäologischer Wanderweg). According to information from the State Office for Care of Monuments in Koblenz, some of these barrows date back to the Bronze Age.

Bruttig-Fankel has both Celtic-Roman and Merovingian-Frankish beginnings, with the constituent community of Bruttig likely being the older of the two. It had its first documentary mention on 4 June 898 as Pruteca im Mayengau in a donation document from the Lotharingian king Zwentibold, whose beneficiary was the Imperially immediate, free-noble convent in Essen. Besides many holdings in the Cologne and Bergheim area, the king transferred to the convent “…in pago magnensi in villa pruteca terra arabilis cum curtile et vineis…” (roughly translated: “…in the Mayen country in the village of Bruttig an estate with associated arable earth and vineyards…”). This document establishes that the village is at least 1,100 years old, likely even older, for there was already an estate with vineyards. A further clue as to the village's Celtic beginnings can be found in the name “Bruttig” itself. Language scholars derive the modern name from the Celtic Brutiacum (“Brut’s Dwelling”) through the Latin Proteca (AD 898) and Prodecha (1250) to today's Bruttig (or variant Pruttig)

The other constituent community, Fankel, had its first documentary mention about 1100. The name derived from the Celtic fank, meaning “wetlands”. Ownership arrangements in the Middle Ages were governed in both Bruttig and Fankel by several so-called Weistümer (a Weistum – cognate with English wisdom – was a legal pronouncement issued by men learned in law in the Middle Ages and early modern times). In the time of French occupation, beginning in 1794, both centres were assigned to the Mairie (“Mayoralty”) of Beilstein, which itself belonged to the Canton of Zell. Administration nevertheless lay with the Canton of Treis, and as of 1816, when Bruttig and Fankel were assigned to the Kingdom of Prussia at the Congress of Vienna, it lay with the former Cochem district. Since 1946, the two centres have been part of the then newly founded state of Rhineland-Palatinate.

In the course of administrative restructuring in Rhineland-Palatinate, the two formerly administratively separate municipalities of Bruttig and Fankel were amalgamated into one, named Bruttig-Fankel.

== Politics ==
=== Municipal council ===
The council is made up of 16 council members, who were elected by majority vote at the municipal election held on 7 June 2009, and the honorary mayor as chairman.

=== Mayor ===
Bruttig-Fankel's mayor is Rainer Welches.

=== Coat of arms ===
The municipality's arms might be described thus: Per pale argent a fess wavy vert, the whole surmounted by a key palewise gules, the wards to chief and turned to sinister, and vert a fleur-de-lis Or.

Bruttig-Fankel has an impaled coat of arms, meaning that it is composed of two other coats united in one field and separated by a vertical line of partition (“per pale”). The former coats belonged to the two constituent communities when they were separate municipalities.

=== Town partnerships ===
Bruttig-Fankel fosters partnerships with the following places:

- Overijse, Flemish Brabant, Belgium since 1958.

== Culture and sightseeing ==
=== Buildings ===
The following are listed buildings or sites in Rhineland-Palatinate’s Directory of Cultural Monuments:

==== Bruttig ====
- Saint Margaret’s Catholic Parish Church (Pfarrkirche St. Margaretha), Hauptstraße – late mediaeval west tower from 1507, sculpture early 16th century, Romanesque Revival quarrystone aisleless church, 1845-1847; in the churchyard wall: cross, 19th century, grave cross from 1504, two grave crosses from 1807 and 1833, gravestone from 1555, 11 grave crosses from, among other years, 1567, 1572, 1598, 1600 and 1614; niche with Crucifixion group from 1599, renovated in 1905, Mary and Joseph, 18th century; whole complex with graveyard and rectory
- Am Moselufer (no number) – town hall, three-floor plastered building, outdoor staircase, from 1619
- Am Moselufer 6 – Schunck’sches Haus, former courthouse and residence, Late Renaissance plastered building from 1652, corner figure of Saint Margaret, 17th/18th century; in the yard the so-called Hinterhaus (“Back House”), partly timber-frame, from 1529, with five-sided oriel, partly timber-frame, from earlier half of 17th century; whole complex
- Am Moselufer 7 – inn, Alte Winzerschenke, timber-frame house, partly solid, from 1667
- Am Moselufer 9 – three-floor plastered timber-frame house, early 16th century
- Am Moselufer 10 – timber-frame house, partly solid, sided, half-hipped roof, 18th century
- Am Moselufer 23 – plastered timber-frame house, partly solid, half-hipped roof, from 1606
- Fausenburg 4/6 – timber-frame house, partly solid, from 1665, timber-frame expansion and roof addition 18th century, timber-frame wing 19th century
- Gobeliusstraße 6 – plastered timber-frame house, partly solid or sided, half-hipped roof, from 17th century
- Hauptstraße – well, apparently mentioned in 1593
- Hauptstraße – wayside cross, 18th/19th century
- Hauptstraße 2 – quarrystone house housing winepress, latter half of 19th century; whole complex
- Hauptstraße 5 – former rectory, Classicist plastered building, 1824; whole complex of buildings with church and graveyard
- Near Hauptstraße 13 – wayside cross from 1816
- Hauptstraße 22 – quarrystone house from 19th century
- Hauptstraße 23 – former school, stately quarrystone building from about 1900
- Hauptstraße 24 – quarrystone house from 1894
- Near Hauptstraße 49 – wayside cross from 1816
- Hauptstraße/corner of Kirchstraße – Baroque Bildstock, 18th century
- Herrenstraße 2 – timber-frame house, partly solid, balloon frame, 1473–1474
- Kirchstraße 2 – three-floor timber-frame house, partly solid, half-hipped roof, from 1510 to 1511, timber framing in middle floor newer
- Kirchstraße 6 – timber-frame house, about 1910 (?)
- Klosterstraße 1 – timber-frame house, partly solid, 1472–1473; whole complex of buildings with quarrystone building adjoining
- Klosterstraße 5 – timber-frame house on top of high pedestal, 16th century, two-floor timber-frame oriel from 1652; towards the back a quarrystone building from the time of building
- Klosterstraße 12 – solid building with gable integrated into wall, 16th century
- Mühlenbachstraße 8 – timber-frame house, partly solid or sided, 17th century (?), hearth heating plates
- Next to Mühlenbachstraße 10 – former synagogue, quarrystone building with half-hipped roof, about 1840; next to it a quarrystone building with mansard roof, 18th century
- Petrus-Mosellanus-Straße 2 – three-floor solid building, latter half of 16th century
- Petrus-Mosellanus-Straße 3 – Moselle-style quarrystone building from about 1900
- Poststraße 2 – two-winged building, back wing possibly from 16th/17th century, front wing from 19th century
- Schunck’sche Straße 7 – two solid buildings, front one essentially mediaeval (?), back one from 16th century
- Kreuzkirche (“Cross Church”), east of the village on Kreisstraße 36 – aisleless church, about 1720, Way of the Cross to the chapel, 7 prostrations, Bildstock-type

==== Fankel ====
- Catholic Church of the Assumption of Mary (Kirche Mariä Himmelfahrt), Brunnenstraße 31 – Romanesque tower, 13th century, quire about 1385, Late Gothic aisleless church, mid 15th century; whole complex of buildings with graveyard: 4 gravestones from 1617, 1685, 1728 and the 17th century; 13 grave crosses from, among other years, 1598, 1610, 1617 and 1750; missionary cross from 17th/18th century; Crucifixion group from 19th century
- Brunnenstraße – fountain made with two basalt basins
- Brunnenstraße (no number) – daycare centre and town hall, well, solid building with church gate from the old fortifications, partly timber-frame, half-hipped roof, dendrochronologically dated to 1559, well
- Brunnenstraße 11 – timber-frame house, partly solid, cellar portal from 1618, half-hipped roof, 18th century
- Brunnenstraße 13 – timber-frame house, partly solid, balloon frame, from 1524, solid building behind, roof dated to 1425
- Brunnenstraße 16 – timber-frame house, partly solid, hipped mansard roof from 1828
- Between Brunnenstraße 16 and 18 – fire station
- Brunnenstraße 17 – tithe house, Late Gothic house with crow-stepped gable, about 1425
- Brunnenstraße 19 – timber-frame house from 1517, balloon frame, roof dated to 1575
- Brunnenstraße 20 – timber-frame house, partly solid, balloon frame, roof dated to 1481 and 1532
- Behind Brunnenstraße 22 – timber-frame house, partly solid, from 18th century
- Brunnenstraße 22 – estate of the Stetzgis of Treis, three-sided enclosed late mediaeval solid building, partly timber-frame, on quarrystone pedestal, 1467; hearth heating plate
- Brunnenstraße 24/26 – timber-frame house, partly solid or plastered, 16th/17th century
- Brunnenstraße 25 – three-floor solid building, timber-frame façade, roof dated to 1432-1433
- Brunnenstraße 11, 13, 16, 17, 19, 20, 22, 24/26, 25, 27, Brunnenstraße 29/Rathausstraße 11/13 (monumental zone) – Brunnenstraße beginning with no. 11 and no. 16 on the other side, with town hall, Engelport Convent's estate, church and graveyard
- Christophorusweg 2 – Late Gothic detached manor house, 1377–1378, partly timber-frame from about 1550
- Nikolausstraße 4 – timber-frame house, partly solid, from 18th century
- Rathausstraße 4 – timber-frame house, partly solid, mansard roof, from 18th century
- Rathausstraße 6 – timber-frame house, partly solid, from 16th century (?)
- Rathausstraße 7 – timber-frame house, partly solid, plastered, 17th century
- Rathausstraße 11/13 – Engelport Convent's estate, timber-frame house, partly solid, hipped roof, relief, 1716; former winepress house, hipped roof, 18th century, commercial building; whole complex
- Rathausstraße 16 – solid building, crow-stepped gable at the back, from 1418, converted 1802
- Rathausstraße 53 – building with mansard roof, 18th century
- At Schulstraße 30 – basalt wayside cross from 1749

=== Regular events ===
- Bruttiger Winzerfest (“Bruttig Winemakers’ Festival”), on the second weekend in August
- Fankeler Weinfest (“Fankel Wine Festival”), on the second weekend in July
- Bruttiger Kirmes (“Bruttig Kermis”), on the first Sunday after 20 July
- Fankeler Kirmes (“Fankel Kermis”), on the first Sunday after 15 August
- Pfingstfest (“Whitsun Festival”)
- FZM GIB GAS tournament, always three weeks after Whitsun
- Weingelage (“Wine Revelry”)

== Economy and infrastructure ==
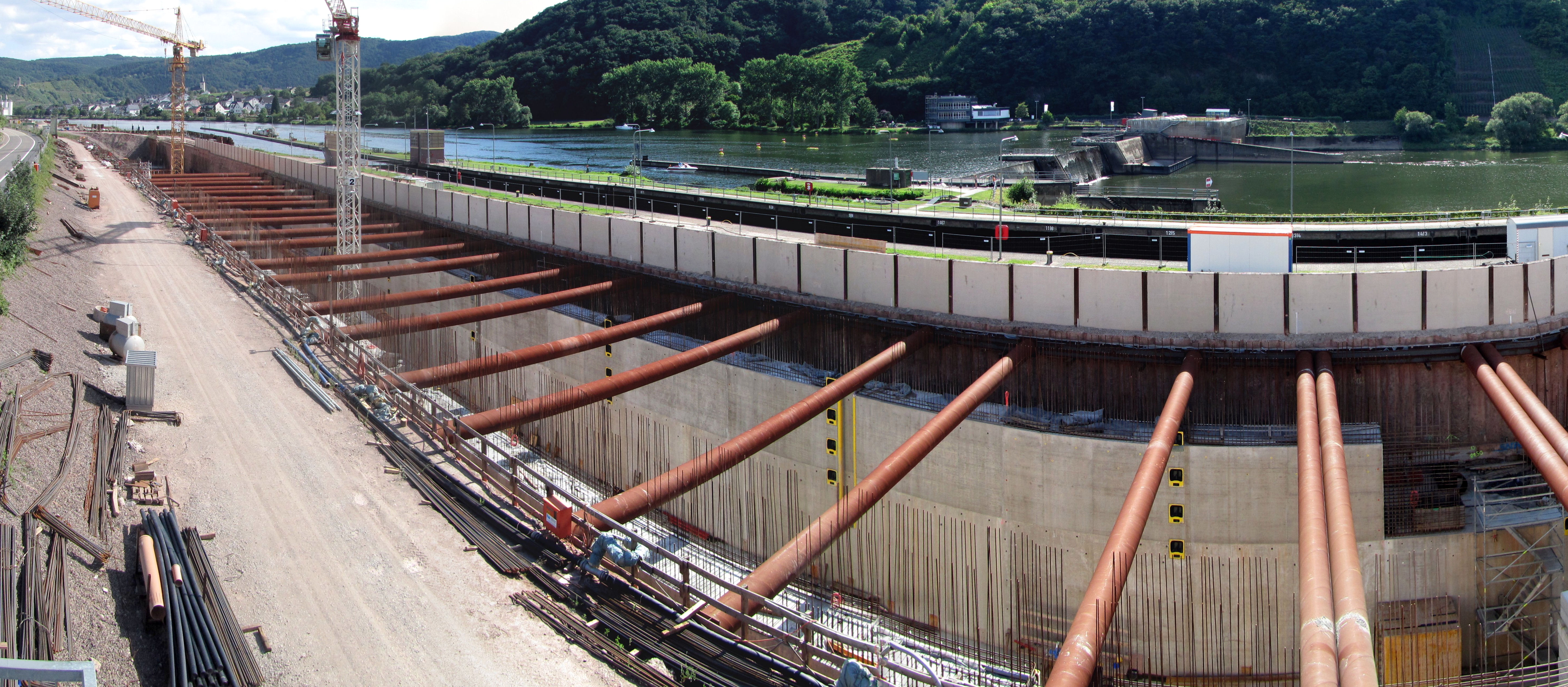
Fankel Weir: construction of a second lock basin, 2009

Winegrowing and tourism characterize the village and belong inseparably together. In the constituent community of Bruttig, on the second weekend in August each year, the great Winemakers’ Festival is held. Well known steep-slope vineyards are Pfarrgarten, Götterlay, Rathausberg, Layenberg and Rosenberg. Raised here mainly is Riesling, although there are also Elbling and various other grape varieties, including some red.

In Fankel is found, besides the Fankel Weir, also the RWE Power AG main control centre, from which all hydroelectric stations at weirs on the German section of the Moselle are controlled.

== Famous people ==
=== Sons and daughters of the town ===
- Petrus Mosellanus (birth name: Peter Schade), b. 1493 in Bruttig, d. 19 April 1524 in Leipzig; Moselle humanist, philologist, theologist and church teacher
