= Basilica of Saint Castor =

Parish church in Koblenz, Germany

Coordinates: 50°21′44″N 07°36′16″E

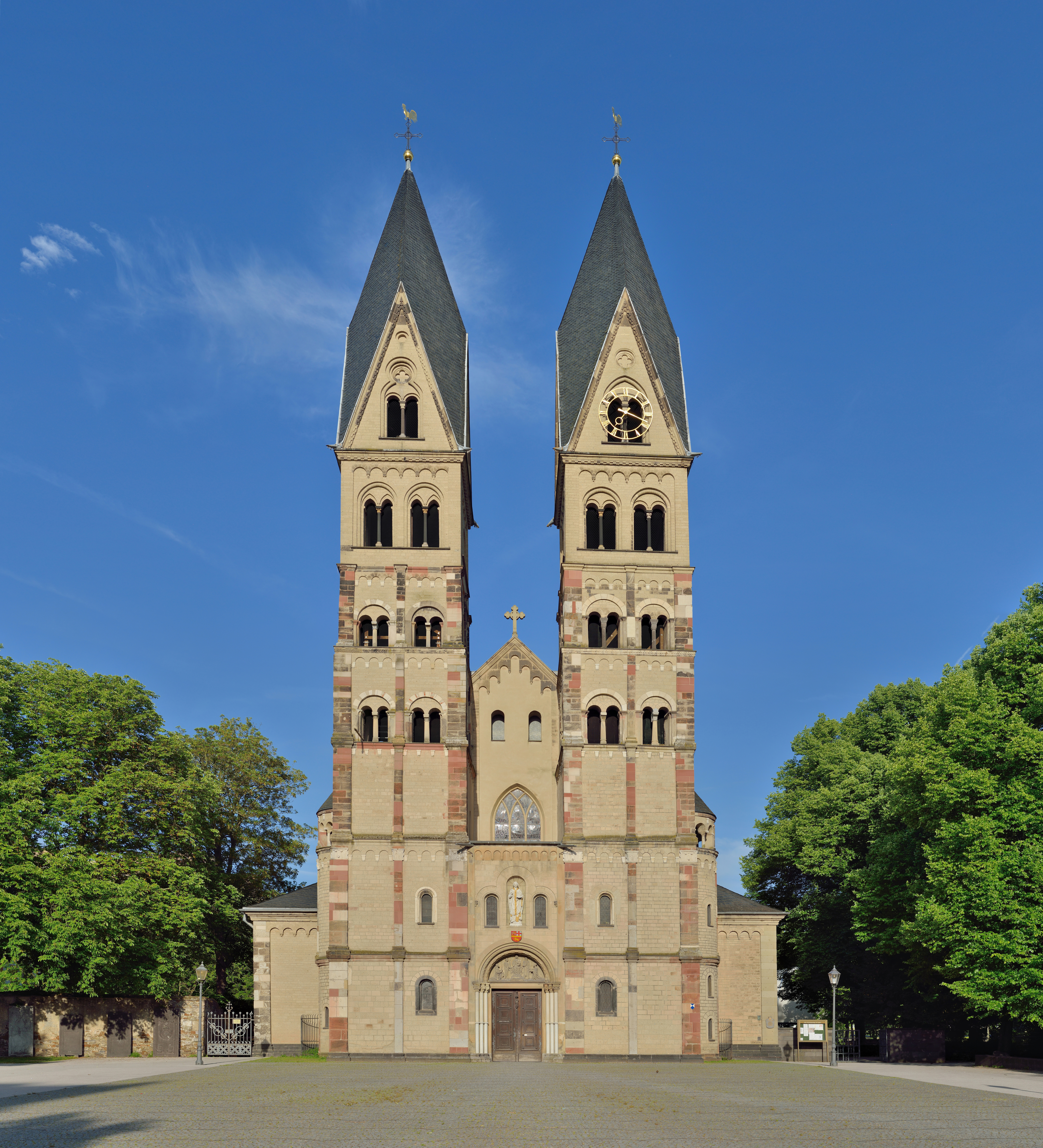
Western front of the Basilica of Saint Castor

The Basilica of Saint Castor (German: Basilika St. Kastor or Kastorkirche) is the oldest church in Koblenz in the German state of Rhineland Palatinate. It is located near Deutsches Eck at the confluence of the Rhine and the Moselle. A fountain called Kastorbrunnen ("Castor well") was built in front of the basilica during Napoleon's invasion of Russia in 1812. Pope John Paul II raised Saint Castor to a basilica minor on 30 July 1991. This church is worth seeing for the historical events that have occurred in it, its extensive Romanesque construction and its largely traditional furnishings.

Since 2002, the Basilica of Saint Castor has been part of the UNESCO World Heritage cultural landscape of the Upper Middle Rhine Valley. In addition, it is a cultural property protected under the Hague Convention.

== History ==
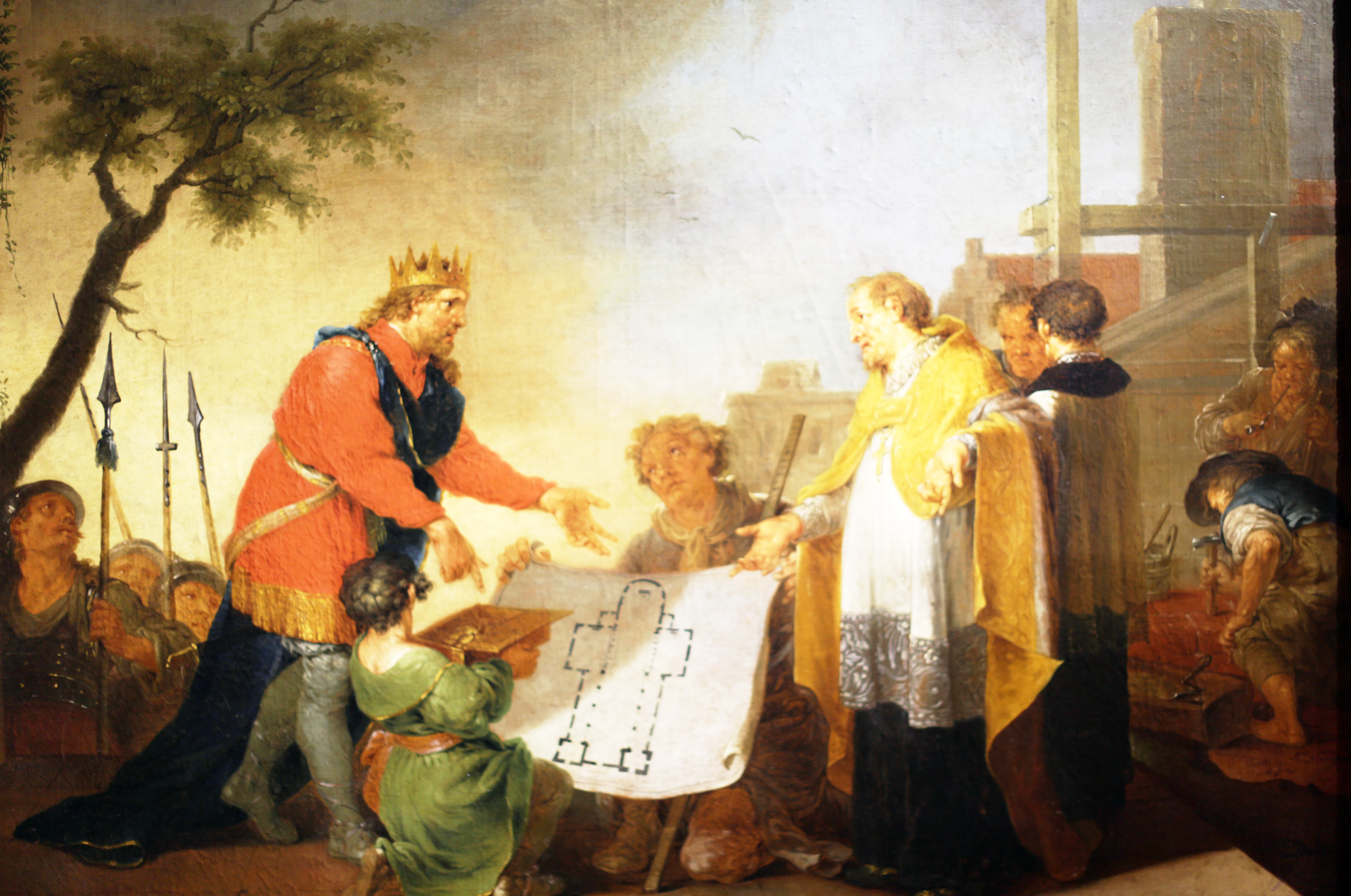
Emperor Louis the Pious donates money to construct Saint Castors church.

The church of Saint Castor was built between 817 and 836 by Hetto, the Archbishop of Trier with the support of Emperor Louis the Pious, just outside the city of Confluentes (the city founded by the Romans in the area) and dedicated on 12 November 836. As Koblenz had a Frankish royal court, Louis was in charge of the construction of the church and it was built as a Carolingian proprietary church. However, Louis did not come to Koblenz until after the consecration of the church. This points to the importance of the Archbishop in the building of the church, especially as the church was until the 13th century outside the city of Koblenz.

The church honours Saint Castor, who is said to have worked as a missionary on the Moselle in the 4th century and to have founded a religious community in Karden. Rizza, the alleged daughter of Louis the Pious, is venerated in the church as a saint of the city of Koblenz and her shrine still stands in the church.

In 836 the church was ordained as a Carolingian hall with a rectangular chancel, but it was extended later in the 9th century with a transept with a semicircular apse. It had become part of the monastery of Saint Castor, with its priest living a monastic life.

The monastery of Saint Castor was closely connected with the history of the Holy Roman Empire in the 9th century. In 842 provisions of the division of the Frankish kingdom were negotiated there by 110 representatives of the sons of Louis the Pious, Lothair I, Charles the Bald and Louis the German, resulting in the Treaty of Verdun signed in 843, which divided the Frankish Empire into three parts (West Francia, Middle Francia and East Francia). The monastery of Saint Castor became an important meeting place for emperors and kings and their descendants and place where disputes between emperors and kings were negotiated and settled. In June 860, talks took place to settle the Carolingian family's internal disputes. Negotiations at the monastery of Saint Castor in 862 led to further territorial changes, which was part of the evolution of the Carolingian Empire into an Eastern and a Western Empire, from which the Holy Roman Empire (and eventually Germany) and France developed.

A cella memoriae (Latin for a small building over a grave which is dedicated to the memory of the deceased) was built in front of the choir as a chapel-like burial vault connected with the church by a circular crypt. In the 10th century, the enclosure was extended to the east as a choir in the form of a rotunda. Probably originating at the same time were the two side aisles of the nave and the lower part of the west end the building (the entrance). It was flanked by two round towers, replaced in 1103 by the two towers that exist today. The towers were originally, however, only five stories high.

In 1138, Conrad III, the first Hohenstaufen was elected by an assembly of the princes of the Holy Roman Empire at St Castor's. The reconstruction of the church to its present shape and size began about 1160 under Provost Buvo. He demolished the crypt, the choir rotunda, the apse and the burial vault and built the present east wing as a square, vaulted choir space with flanking towers, a semi-circular apse, a treasury and a sanctuary. After 1200, the two western towers were each increased by one story, to make the current seven story towers.

Saint Castor's was damaged in the battle of 1199 between Otto IV and Philip of Swabia in the dry bed of the Moselle near Koblenz. Repairs were made and the nave needed to be reconstructed. The Archbishop of Trier John I inaugurated the renovated church, together with its altars on 27 July 1208. The building completed in 1208 had a flat ceiling, but by the end of the 13th century this had been replaced by a vaulted roof.

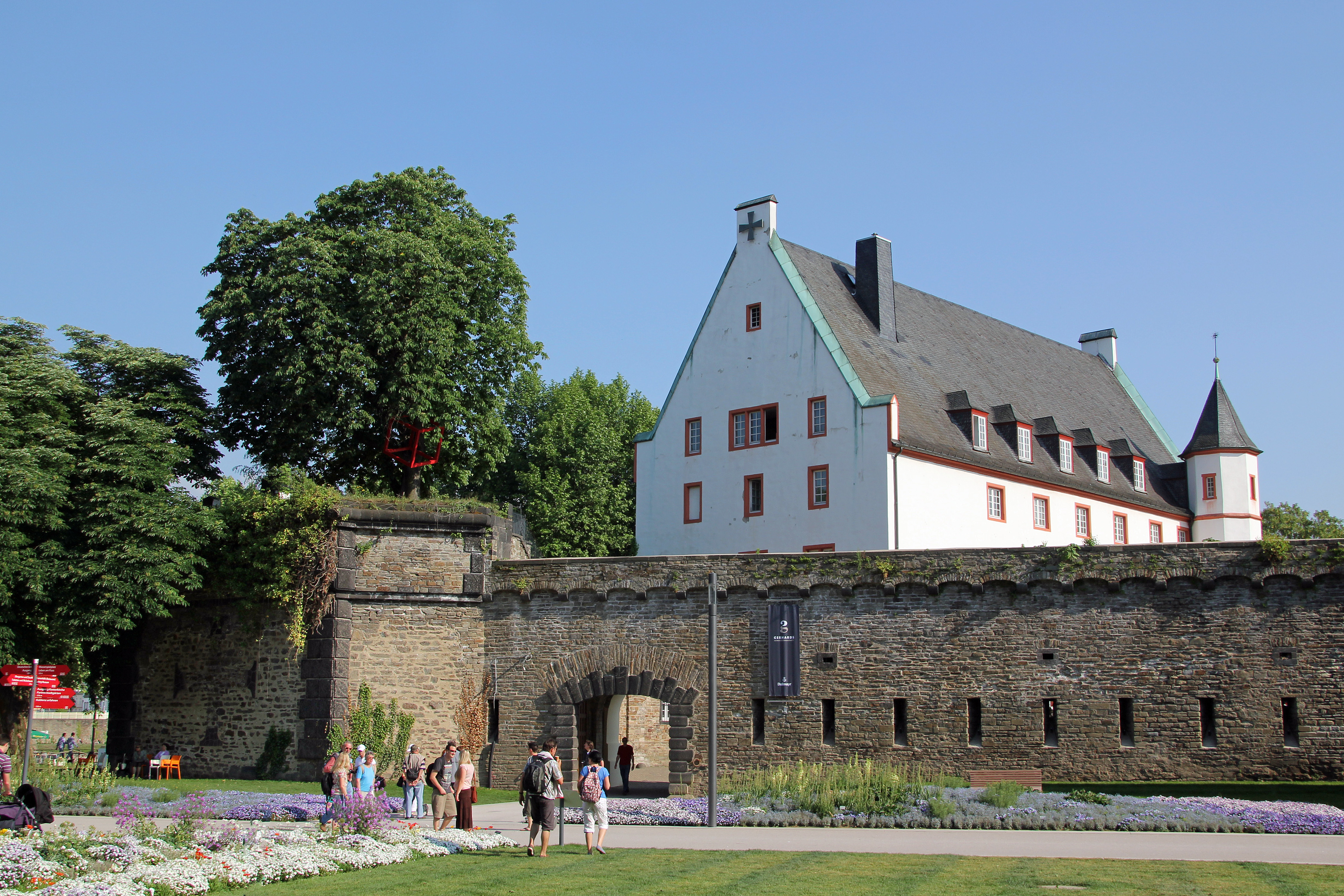
Deutschherrenhaus with the Cross of the Teutonic Order

In 1110, the Archbishop of Trier, Bruno of Lauffen founded a hospital in Koblenz next to Saint Castor's, one of the first institutions for nursing north of the Alps. Archbishop Theodoric of Wied in 1216 invited the Teutonic Knights to Koblenz and gave them part of the site of Saint Castor's along with the hospital of St. Nicholas located there. One motivation for the establishment of the order in Koblenz was to undertake nursing at the hospital. Soon after the Deutschherrenhaus was established close by at Deutsches Eck, where the Moselle flows into the Rhine, to manage the order's Koblenz bailiwick (Ballei). The bailiwick was under the direct authority of the Grand Master. This branch of the Teutonic Order was originally called the Deutscher Ordt and later the Deutsches Eck.

In 1338, the last important meeting was held at the church. Emperor Ludwig the Bavarian and Edward III of England swore allegiance and friendship at Saint Castor's.

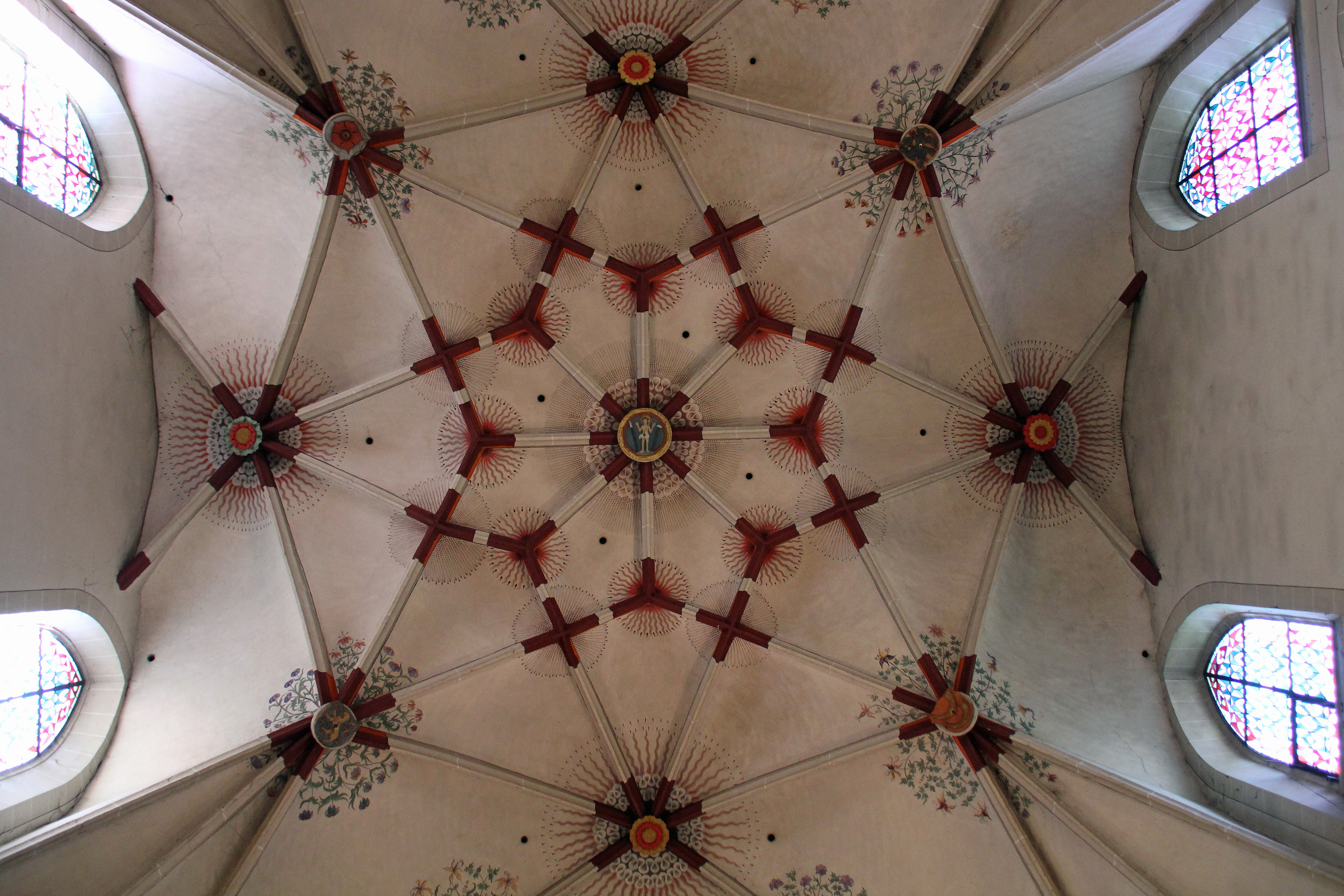
One of the two stellar vaults

From 1496 to 1499, vaulting was installed to replace the Romanesque roof. At the same time, two star vaults were erected in the nave and above the altar.

As a result of the secularisation of church lands agreed at the Reichsdeputationshauptschluss ("Principal Conclusion of the Extraordinary Imperial Delegation") of 1803, Saint Castor's became a collegiate church with monastery buildings on its west facade and on its south side. Under the leadership of the Prussian inspector of buildings, Johann Claudius von Lassaulx a complete restoration of the interior began in 1830, which soon came to a standstill due to lack of money. As a result of a legacy of the dean Edmund Bausch and a gift of King Frederick William IV the restoration was carried out from 1848 to 1849.

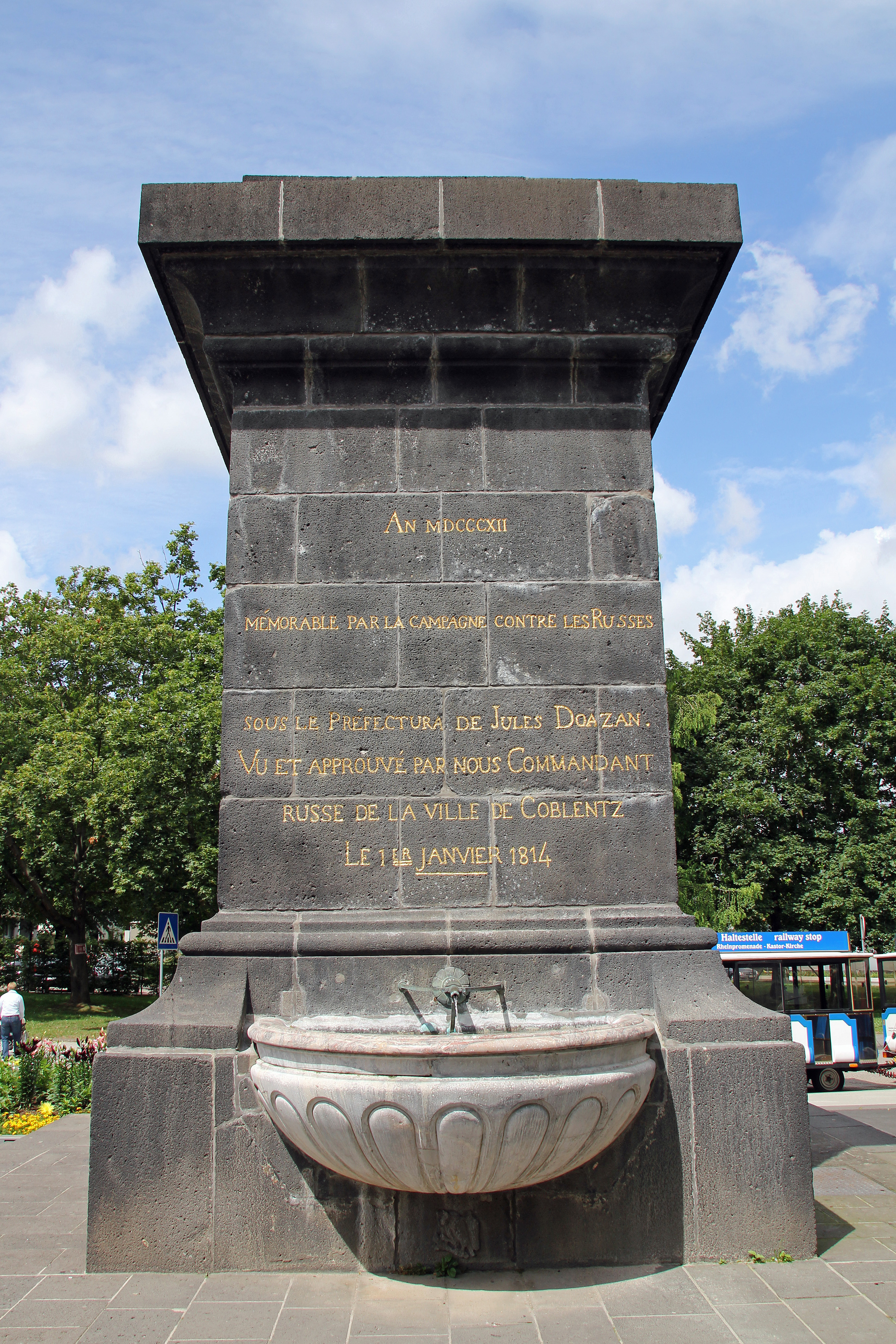
Kastorbrunnen fountain

Since 1812, the square in front of Saint Castor's has been the location of a fountain called Kastorbrunnen, which has a humorous comment referring to the Napoleonic wars, which also affected Koblenz.

Between 1840 and 1860, the interior was provided with frescoes. The final appearance of Saint Castor's was restored between 1890 and 1894, when the entire church was provided with a veneer of tuff. At the same time, the brickwork of the south aisle was renewed.

On 6 November 1944 Saint Castor's was damaged by a British air raid. In March 1945 the outer walls were also damaged by artillery. The stone material including the vault, however, remained largely intact. In 1948 enough money was raised for its reconstruction and a 25-year renovation began. Extensive renovation and restoration work was carried out on the towers in 1979 to 1990. The restoration omitted the western gallery and of the organ of 1728. A new main organ was built in the transept in 1962. A small choir organ was additionally bought in 1990 and placed below the main organ. The main organ was removed in 2013 and a new main organ is installed in 2014 on west wall above the church entry.

Pope John Paul II raised Saint Castor's to a basilica minor on 30 July 1991.

== Construction ==
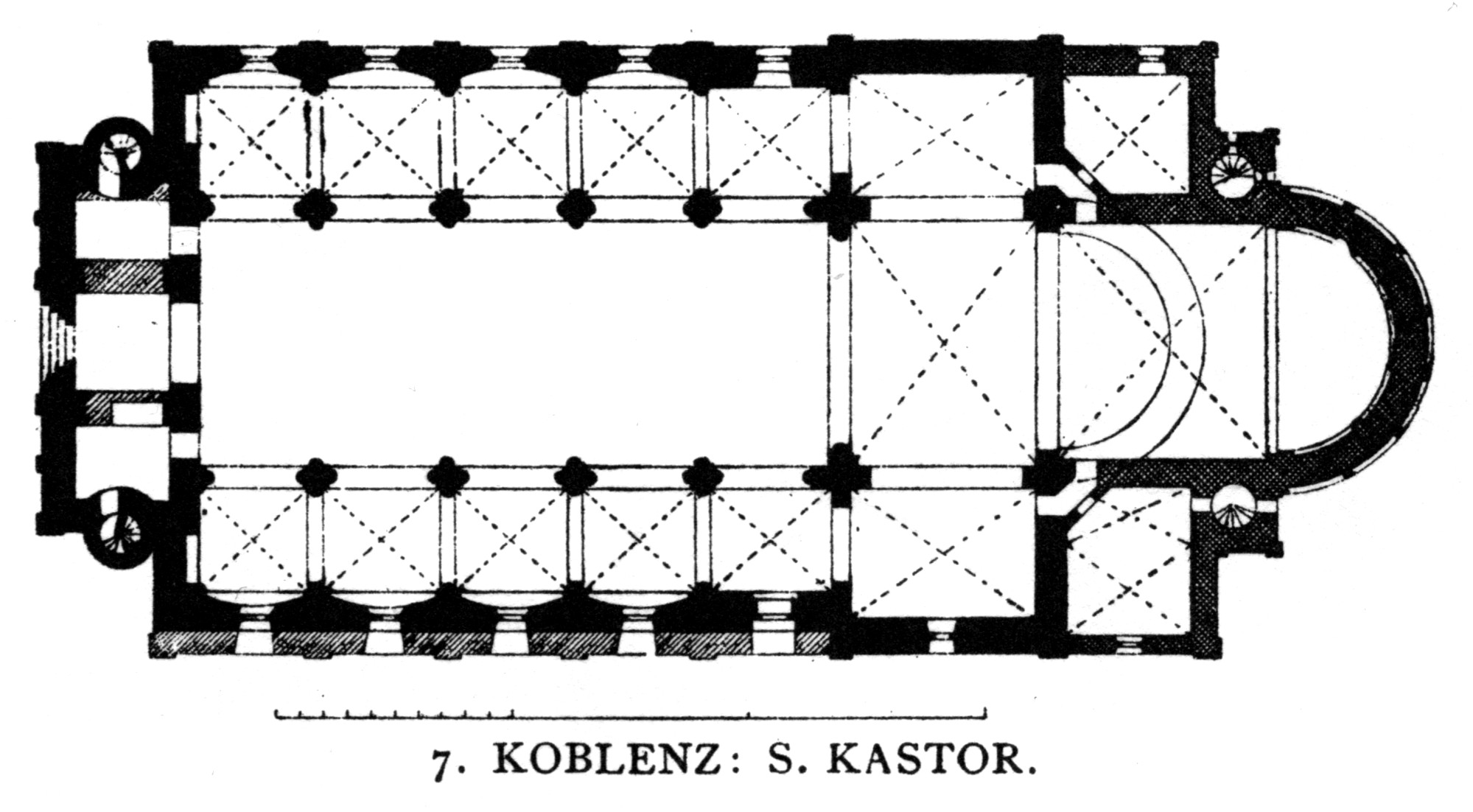
Ground plan

The church is built as a basilica with a nave and two aisles. The narrow eastern transept towers over the aisles. The choir, which was built around 1160, with a round, three-story apse flanked on both sides by a five-story tower. The third floor of the apse is a dwarf gallery with 21 arches. Some of the columns around the windows carry a lion as a symbol of Christ.

Above the entrance is a chapel of St. Michael. A war memorial erected in 1963 in the lobby is also dedicated to St. Michael.

The steep gables of the rhomboid roof (rhombendach) on the western towers were installed at the beginning of the 13th century. Only two simply structured pilasters in the basement of the western towers date from the Carolingian period. The church including the entrance hall is 58.25 m long and its overall width is 25.3 m. The towers are 44 m high, 6 m wide and 6.8 m deep.

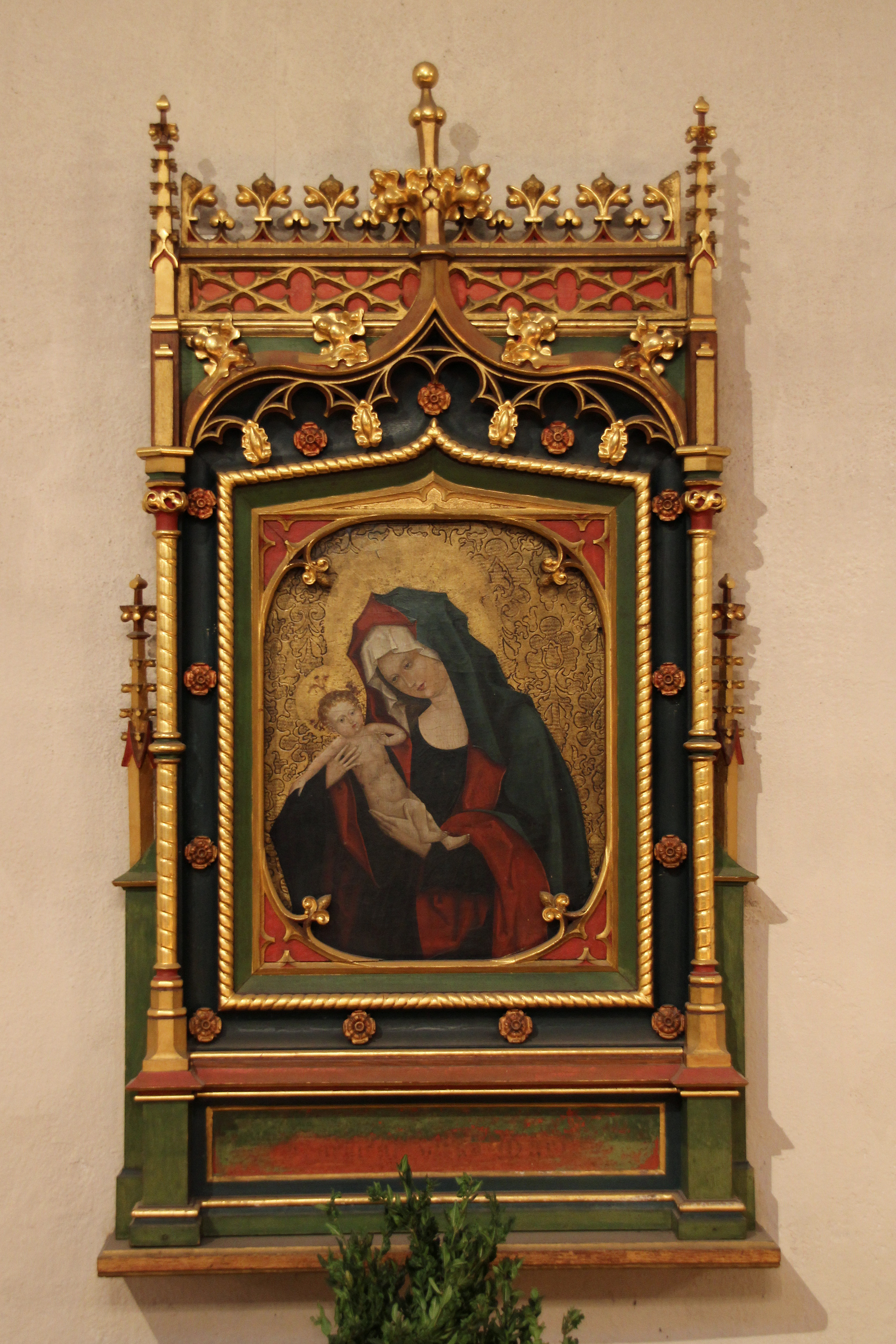
St. Brigid Madonna

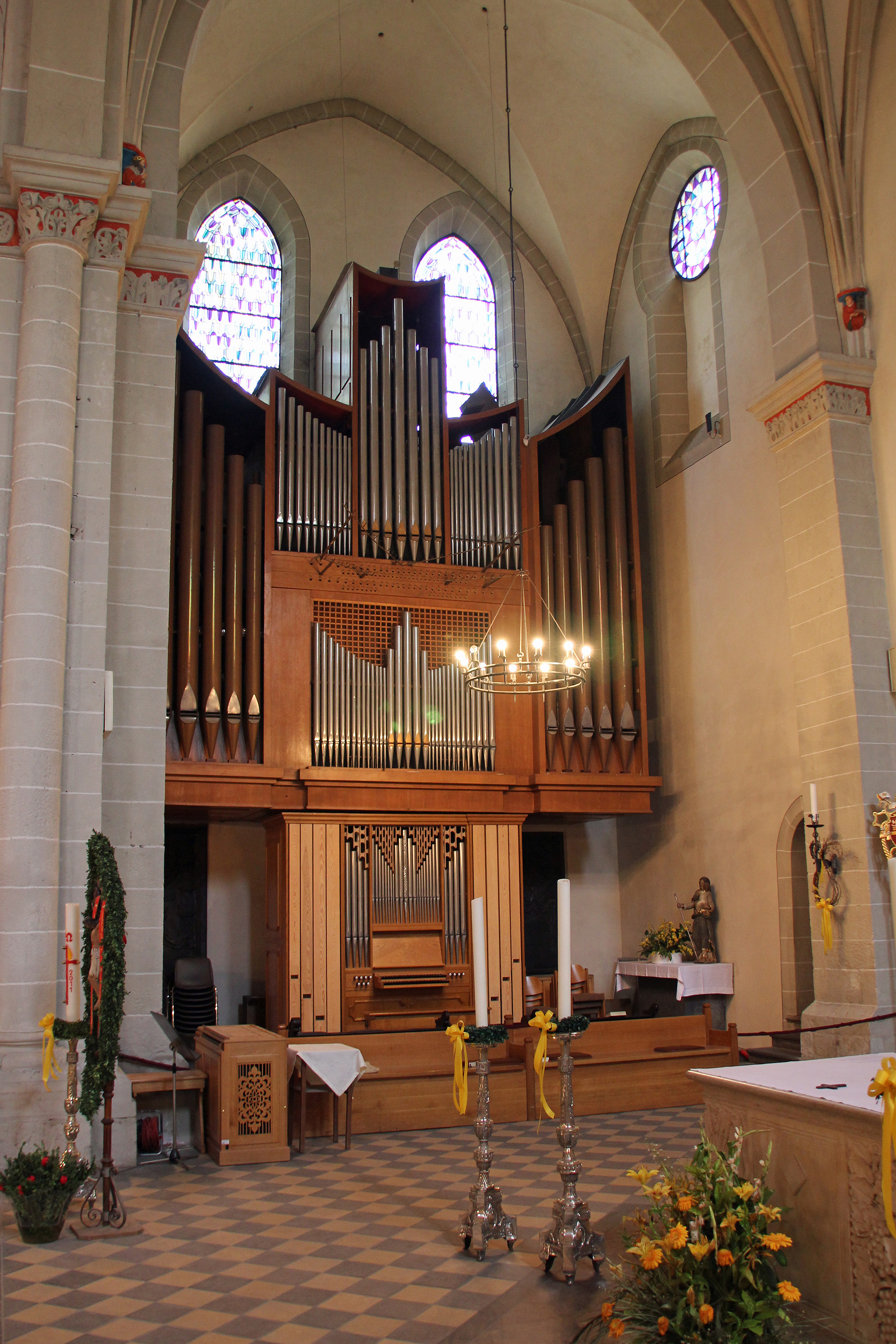
Old Main Organ (above, 1962) and Choir Organ (below, 1990)

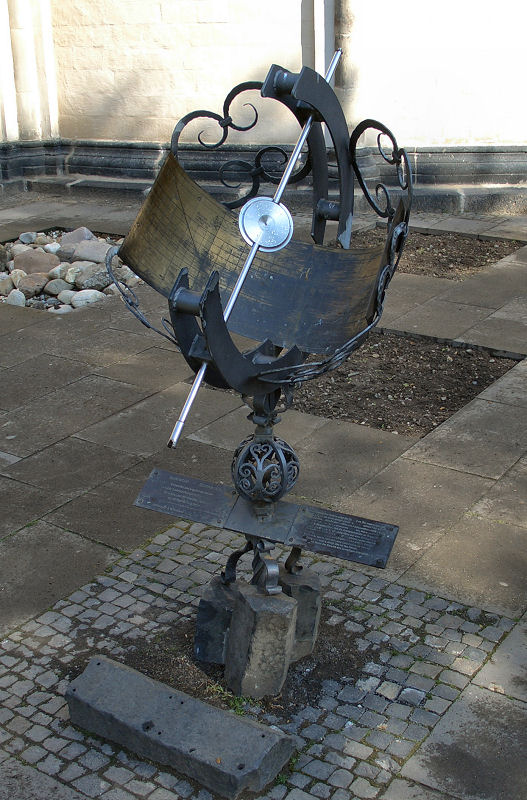
Sundial in front of the east chancel

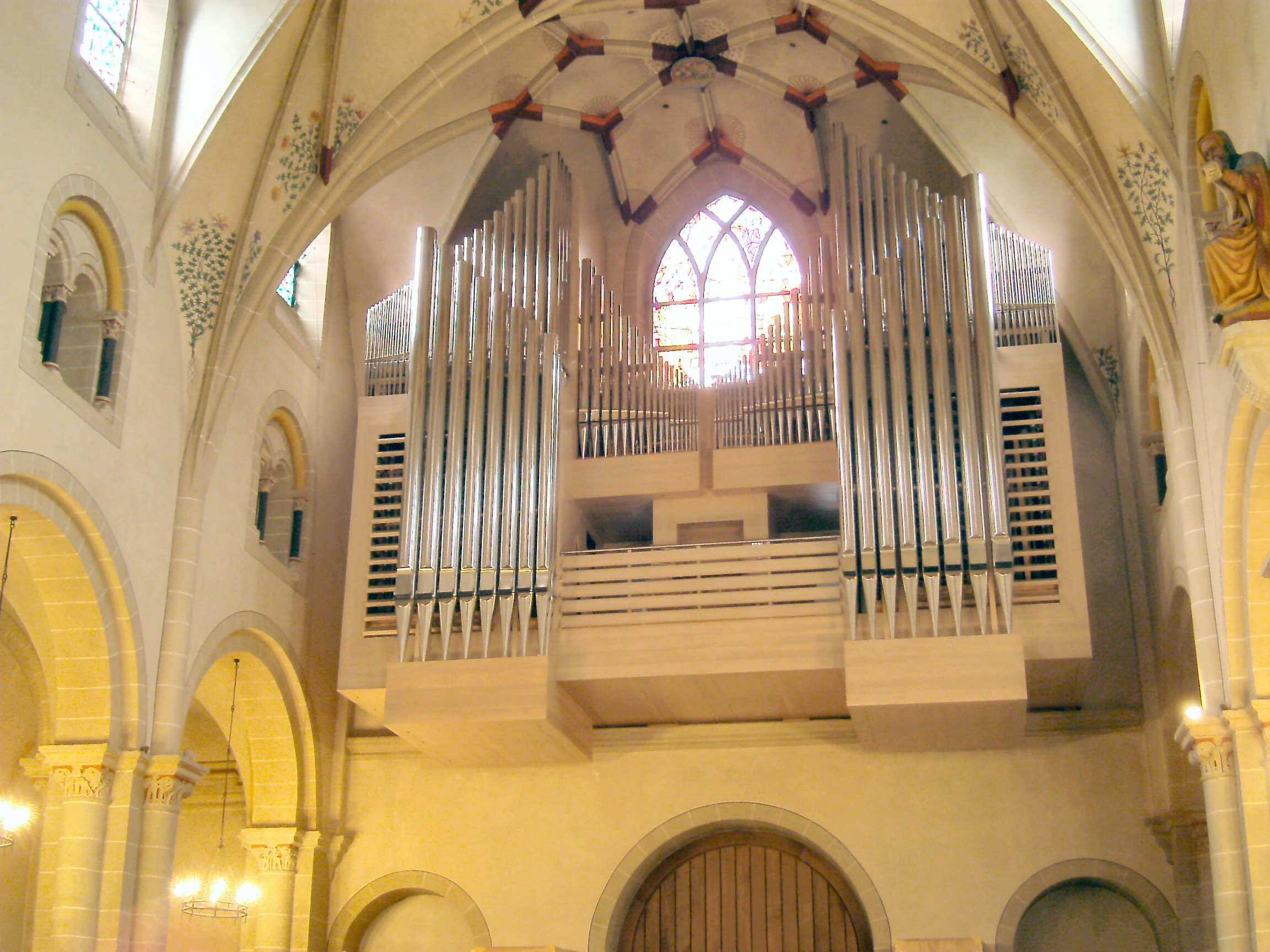
New Main Organ (2014)

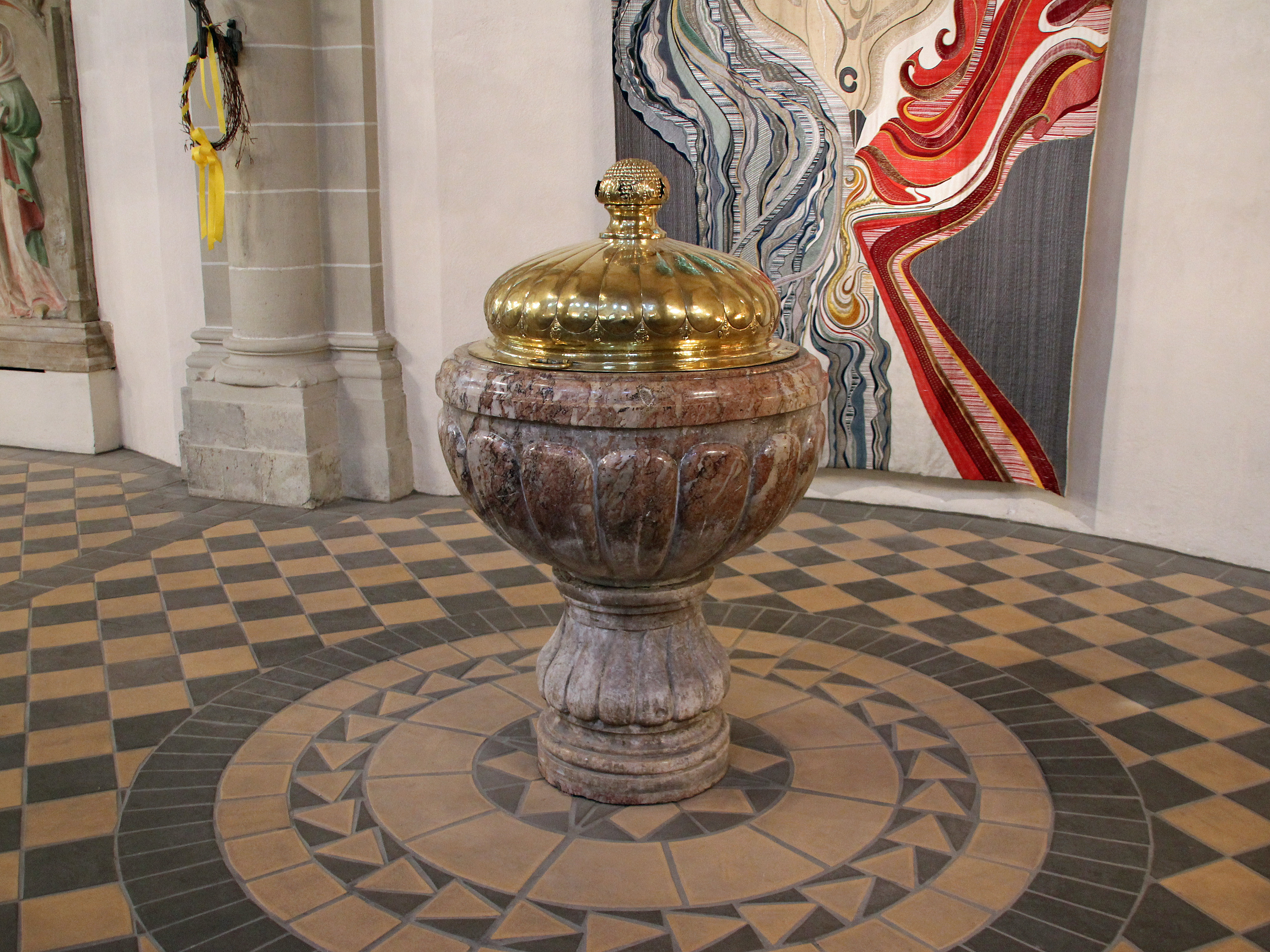
The baptismal font of the church

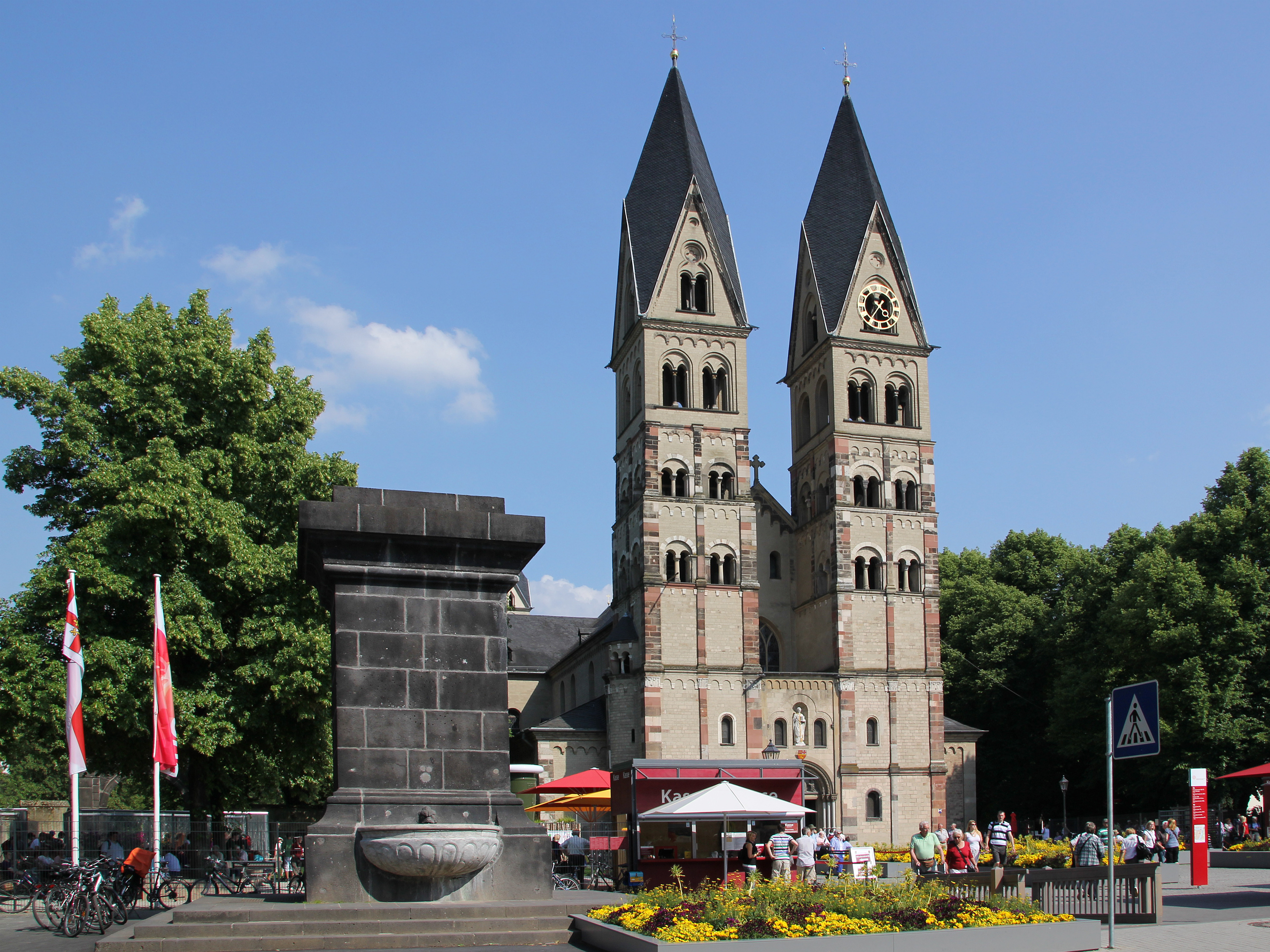
Basilica of Saint Castor with Kastorbrunnen fountain

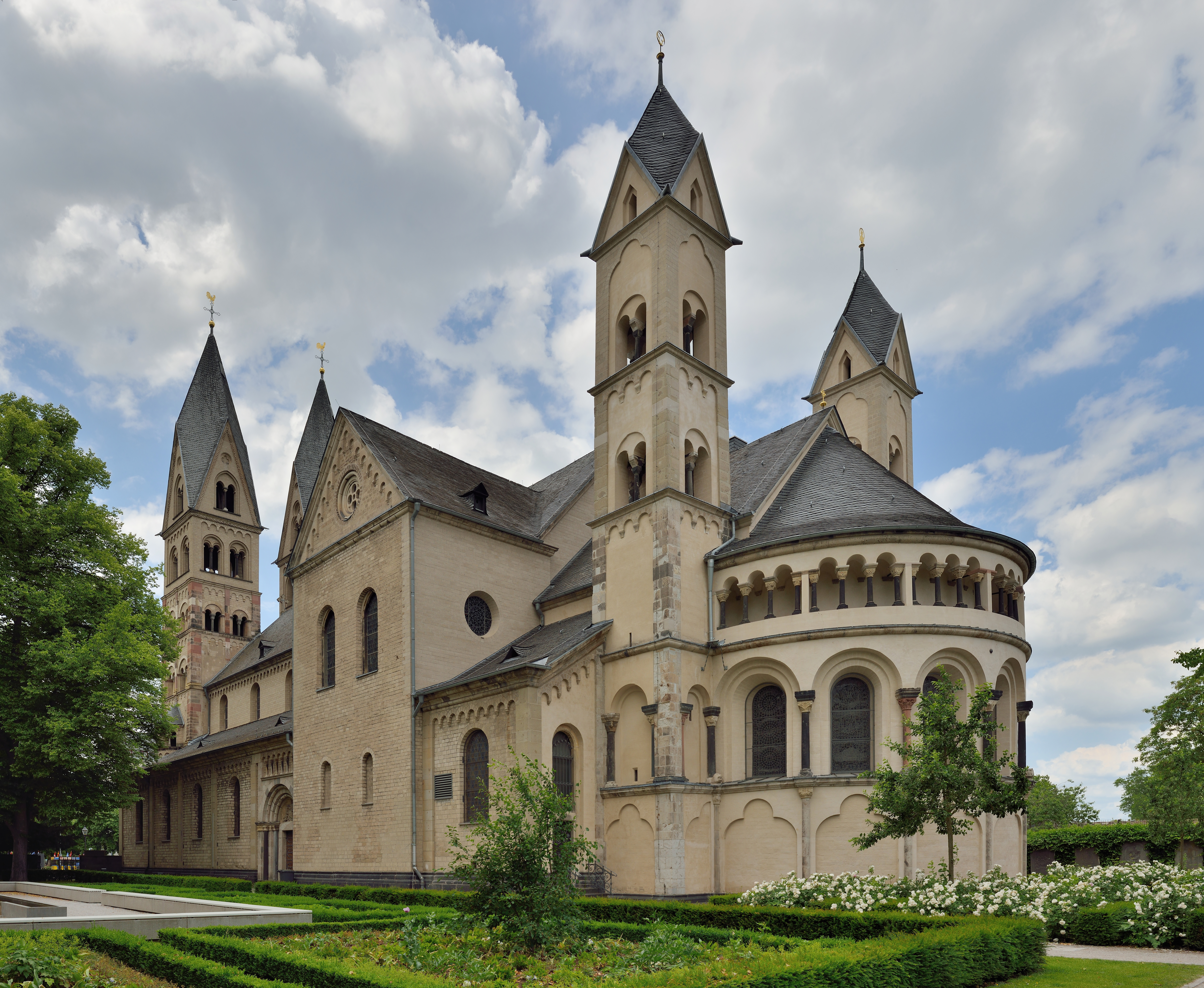
Southern side of the Basilica of Saint Castor

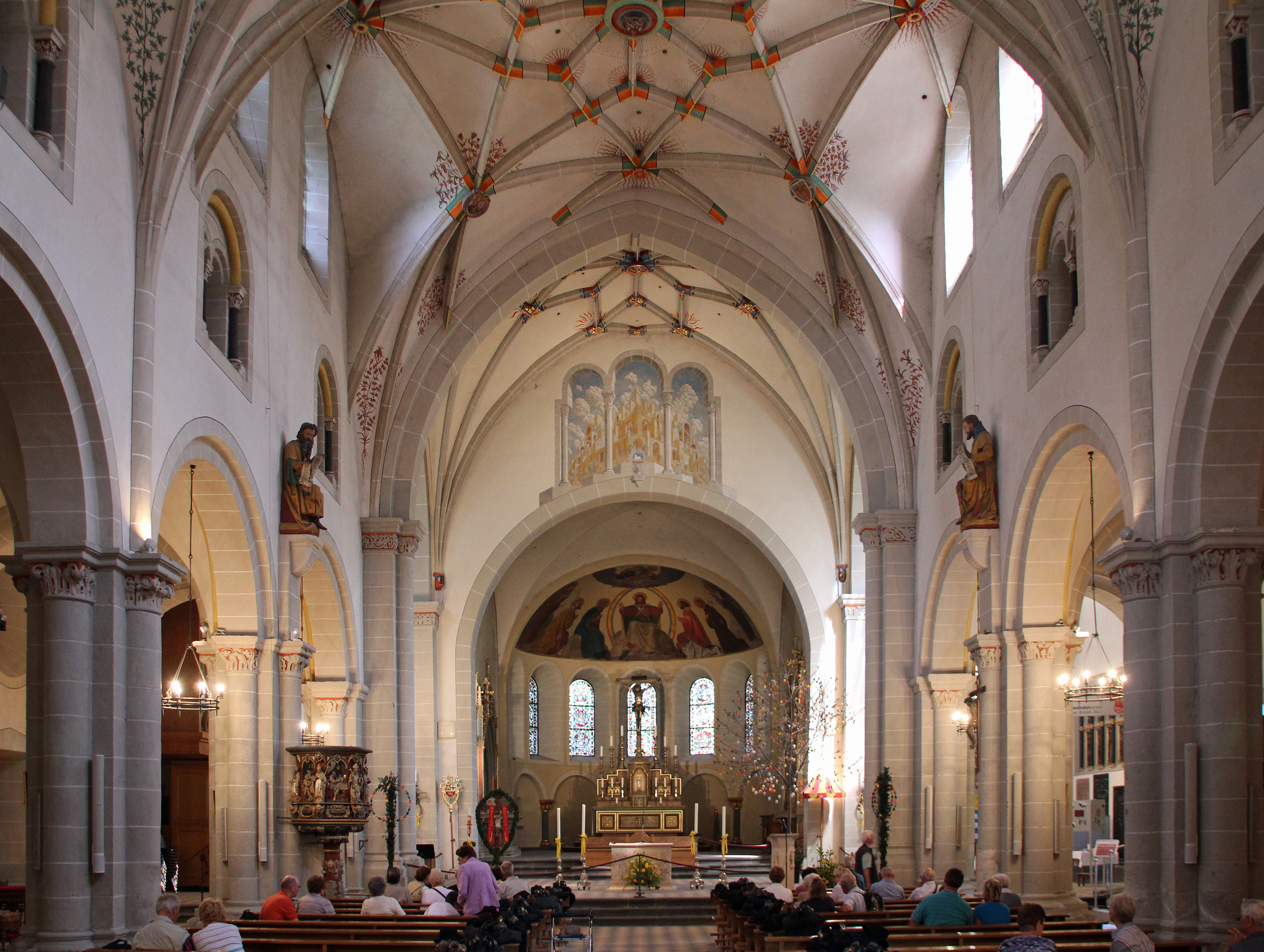
Interior

== Forecourt ==
Archaeological investigations in 1990 have shown that the place has been used since the first century for religious purposes. In the La Tène period there was a hut here deepened with two fireplaces. A Gallo-Roman temple was built around 100 and stood there until the beginning of the 7th century, when a memorial was created with a Christian cemetery.
