= Castor of Karden =

Priest and hermit, Catholic saint

Saint Castor of Karden
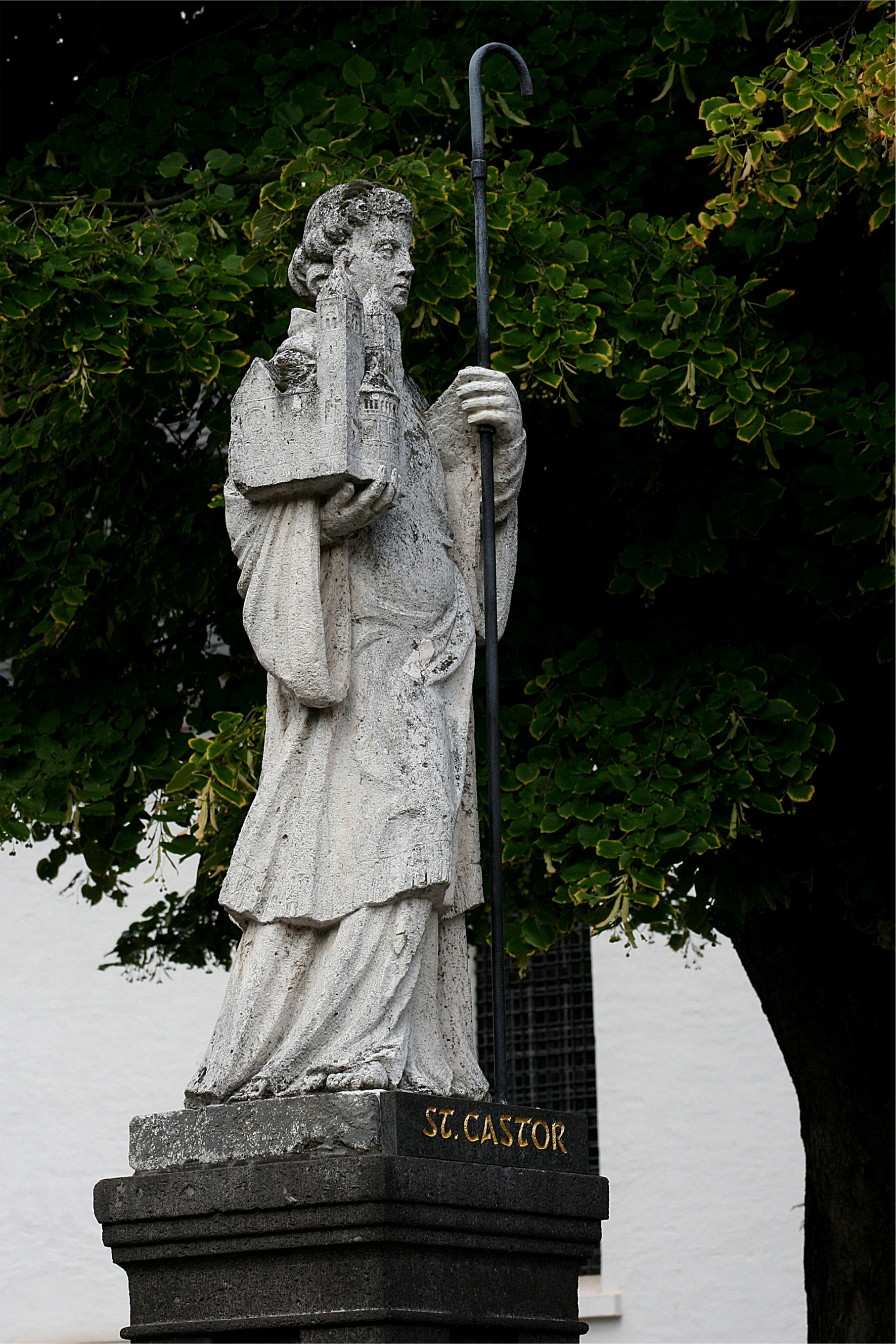
- Statue of Saint Castor at Karden.

Priest
- Born: Aquitaine?
- Died: ~400 AD; Karden
- Venerated in: Roman Catholic Church, Eastern Orthodox Church
- Major shrine: Basilika St. Kastor (Basilica of St. Castor), Koblenz
- Feast: 13 February
- Patronage: Koblenz

Saint Castor of Karden (German: Kastor von Karden) was a priest and hermit of the 4th century who is venerated as a saint by the Catholic Church. Castor was a pupil of Maximinus of Trier around 345 AD, and was ordained as a priest by Maximinus. Like his teacher, Castor may have come from the region of Aquitaine. At his ordination, Castor settled at Karden on the Moselle as a hermit with various companions, where they dedicated themselves to an ascetic life and established a small religious community.

Castor's companions there included the Aquitanian pilgrim Saint Potentinus, and Potentinus’ two sons Felicius and Simplicius.

Castor died at Karden at an advanced age.

== Veneration ==
By the year 791 AD, there was already a reliquary dedicated to Castor, which was translated to the Paulinuskirchen at Karden. In 836, the relics were translated to what became the Basilica of St. Castor at Koblenz by Archbishop Hetto of Trier.
