= Kastorbrunnen =

- en: Saint Castor's Fountain
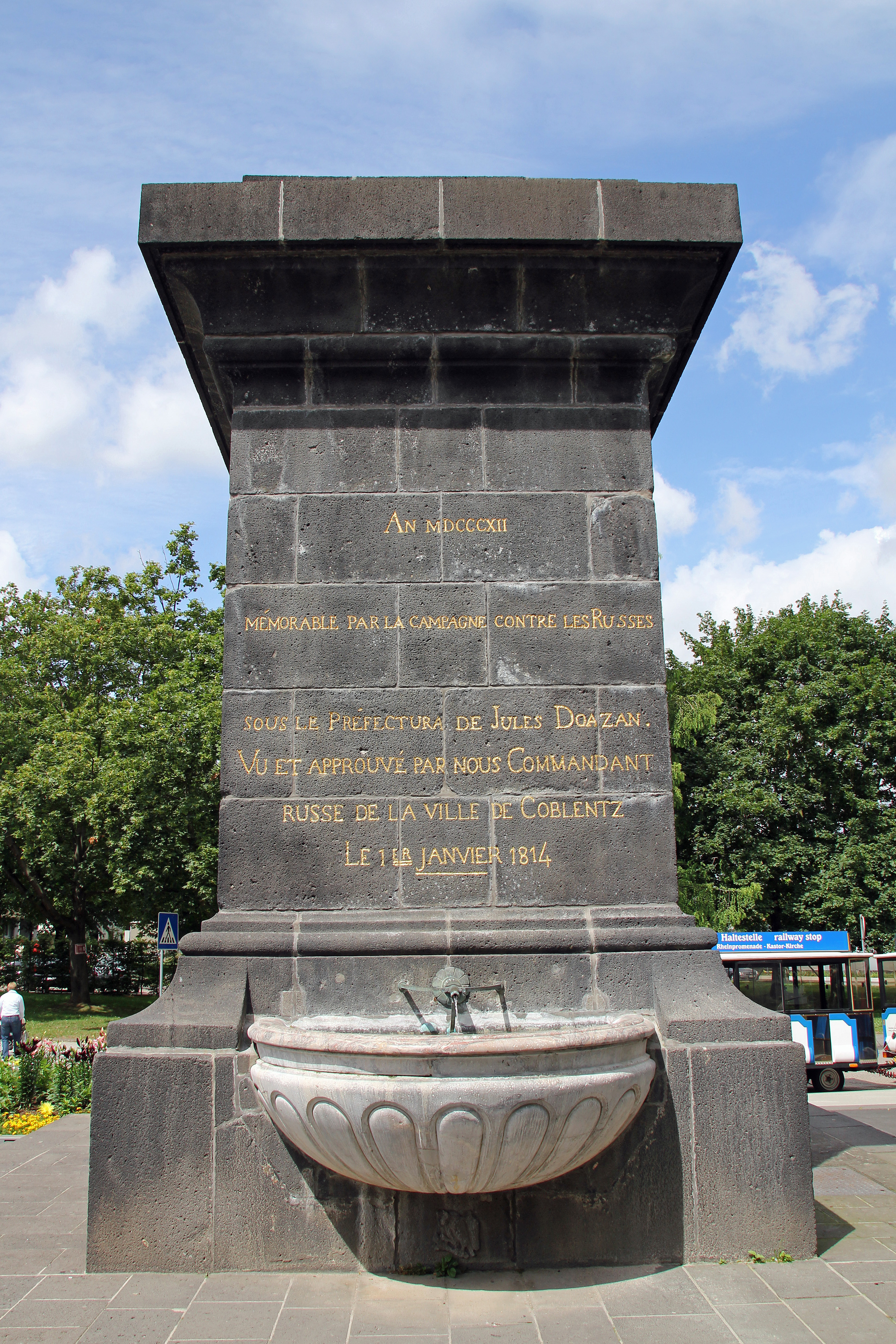
- The Kastorbrunnen showing the inscriptions
- Artist: Jean Marie Thérèse Doazan
- Year: 1812
- Medium: Niedermendig basalt
- Location: Basilica of St. Kastor, Koblenz, Rhineland-Palatinate, Germany
- 50°21′45″N 7°36′12″E

The Kastorbrunnen (Saint Castor's Fountain) in the forecourt of the Basilica of St. Kastor in Koblenz, Rhineland-Palatinate, Germany, is a curious testimony of the Napoleonic Wars. The fountain, built in 1812, was connected to the first aqueduct of the Elector Palatine.

== History ==
Jean Marie Thérèse Doazan, the prefect of the French department of Rhin-et-Moselle, built the neo-classical fountain made of basalt blocks in 1812 in front of the basilica. His hastily written inscription, inscribed in orthographically incorrect French, was intended to commemorate Napoleon's supposedly successful campaign in Russia. The text says:

An MDCCCXII / Mémorable par la campagne contre les Russes / sous le Prefectura de Jules Doazan.

(that is: In 1812 / Memorial to the campaign against the Russians / under the prefecture of Jules Doazan.)

In fact, Napoleon's campaign in Russia ended in catastrophic defeat. In the War of the Sixth Coalition on New Year's Eve of 1814, the predominantly Russian Army Corps under General Saint-Priest, which formed the right wing of Blücher's Silesian Army, crossed the Rhine between Neuwied and the Lahn estuary with the main focus on Koblenz. The French had recently vacated the city and left it to the Russians without a fight. Saint-Priest, however, showed humor and did not remove Doazan's fountain or the first inscription, but put a second one underneath. It is:

Vu et approuvé par nous Commandant / Russe de la ville de Coblentz / le 1^{er} janvier 1814.

(that is: Seen and approved by us, Russian commander of the city Koblenz, on 1 January 1814.)

== Construction ==
The Kastorbrunnen is a large square of Niedermendig basalt cubes, and was originally in the middle of the square. It was created to the plans of the military engineer Dagobert Chauchet by the sculptor Rauch from Aachen, and has a high, grooved base and a wide grooved end plate. There are two suspended semicircular fountain shells from Lahn marble attached. The well was fed with spring water piped from Metternich and, since 15 August 1812 (the birthday of the emperor Napoleon) has supplied the neighborhood with clean drinking water. It supported a group of figures made of limestone with the personifications of the Rhine and Moselle. Because of severe weathering the sculpture was removed shortly after 1817. A copy is now in the garden of the Electoral Palace. In the 1950s the fountain, which the French had placed on the axis of the Kastorgasse, and thus in the line of sight of the basilica, was moved a few meters to the north to clear the view of the church.

== Protection ==
The Kastorbrunnen is a protected cultural monument, and is registered in the list of monuments of the state of Rhineland-Palatinate. It is located in Koblenz-Altstadt at the Kastorhof.

Since 2002 Kastorbrunnen has been listed as a UNESCO World Heritage Site, Upper Middle Rhine Valley.
