= Treis-Karden =

- Municipality
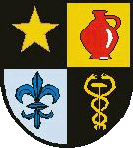
- Coat of arms

- Location of Treis-Karden within Cochem-Zell district
- Interactive map of Treis-Karden
- Location within Germany Location within Rhineland-Palatinate
- Coordinates: 50°10′41″N 7°18′08″E
- Country: Germany
- State: Rhineland-Palatinate
- District: Cochem-Zell
- Municipal assoc.: Cochem
- Subdivisions: 2

Government
  - Mayor (2019–24): Hans-Josef Bleser (CDU)

Area
  - Total: 31.37 km^{2} (12.11 sq mi)
- Elevation: 87 m (285 ft)

Population (2025-12-31)
  - Total: 2,104
  - Density: 67.07/km^{2} (173.7/sq mi)
- Time zone: UTC+01:00 (CET)
  - Summer (DST): UTC+02:00 (CEST)
- Postal codes: 56253
- Dialling codes: 02672
- Vehicle registration: COC
- Website: www.treis-karden-mosel.de

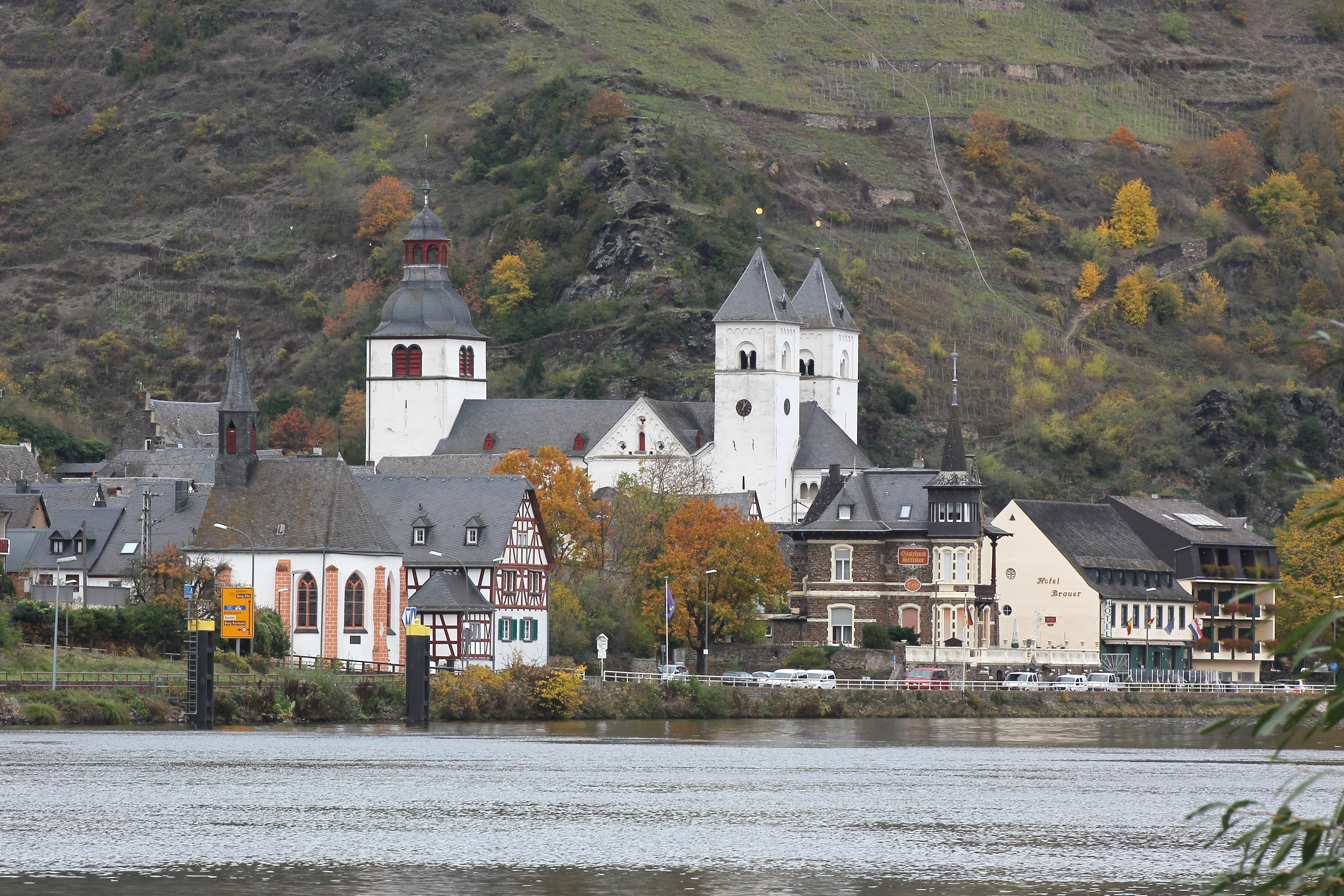
View from Treis to Karden

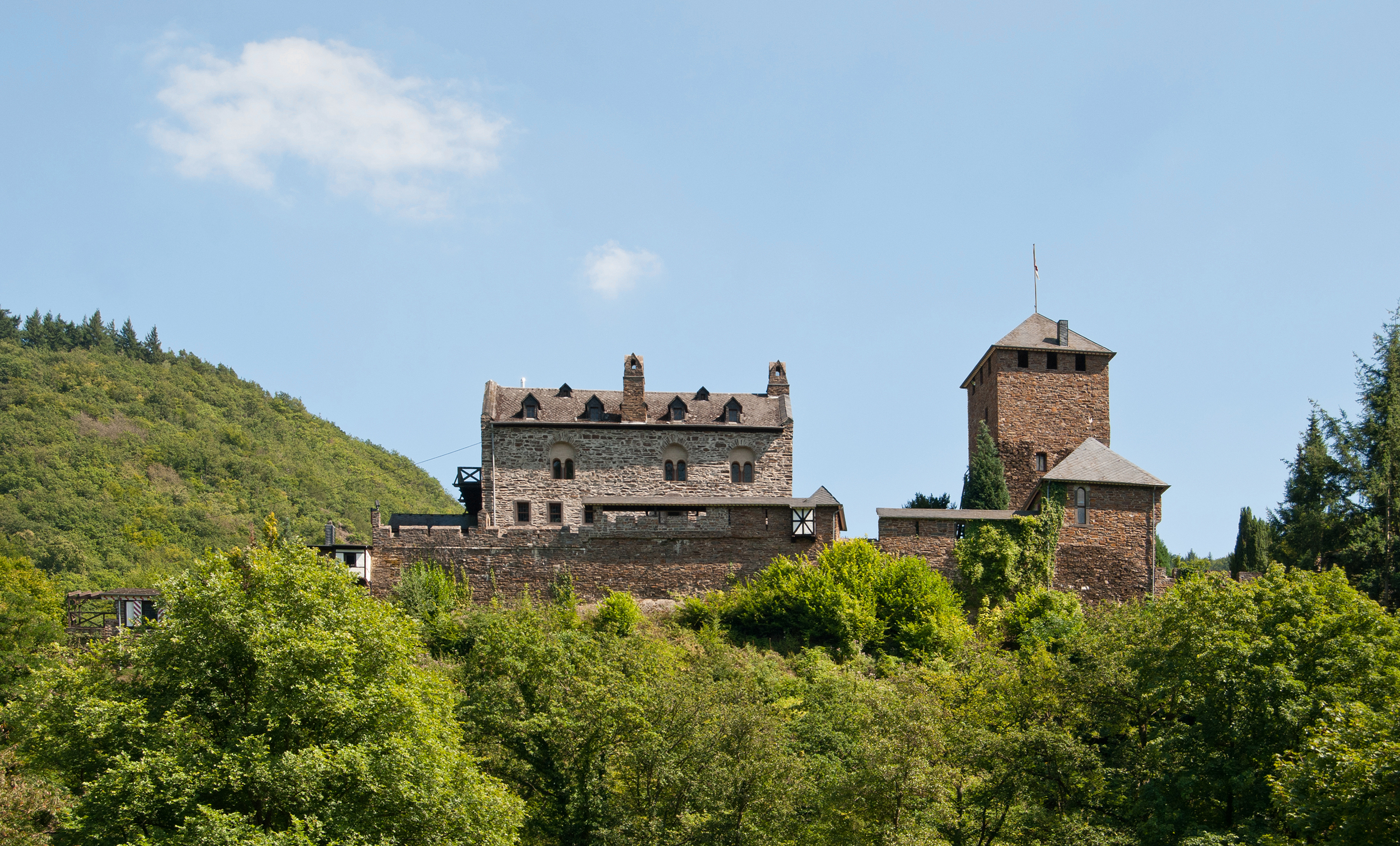
Castle Wildburg in 2012

Treis-Karden (pronounced [ˈtʁaɪs ˈkaʁdn̩]) is an Ortsgemeinde – a municipality belonging to a Verbandsgemeinde, a kind of collective municipality – in the Cochem-Zell district in Rhineland-Palatinate, Germany. It was the seat of the former like-named Verbandsgemeinde until 1 July 2014. Since then, it is part of the Verbandsgemeinde Cochem. Treis-Karden is a state-recognized tourism resort (Fremdenverkehrsort).

== Geography ==
=== Location ===
The municipality lies on the river Moselle, roughly 10 km (6.2 mi) east-northeast of Cochem.

== History ==
According to the latest research findings, Treis had its first documentary mention in 762 as trisgodros villa publica. The document in question is actually a 10th-century copy in Prüm Abbey’s Liber aureus. There were holdings at Treis owned by Polish queen Richeza, Count Palatine Ezzo's daughter, who apparently donated her property in 1051 and 1056 to the Brauweiler Monastery near Cologne. Beginning in the 11th century, Saint Castor's Foundation (Stift St. Kastor) in Karden had, by way of donations and purchases, important landholdings. In 1103, Ravengiersburg Monastery obtained by way of trade with St. Stephan in Mainz an estate in Treis (curtis in Tris). The name Karden is a modern form of the name for a Roman vicus, named in the latter half of the 5th century as Cardena by the geographer of Ravenna. In the late 6th century, Karden was the centre of a greater parish out of whose college of priests arose Saint Castor's Foundation in the 9th century. In 926, an exchange agreement contained the reference in Karadone, and in the 11th century, Karden was named as villa Cardiniacus

Saint Castor is held to have founded a Christian community in Karden as early as the 4th century. Castor's bones went in the 9th century mostly to Saint Castor's Church (Kastorkirche) in Koblenz. In antiquity and in the Middle Ages, Karden was a place of importance whose history was defined by the collegiate foundation that existed here until 1802. Karden was the centre of an archdeaconry. The foundation's provost was through personal union one of the five archdeacons of the Archbishopric of Trier.

Treis was the main centre of the Trechirgau. When this gau's counts, the Berthold-Bezeline family, died out in the late 11th century, it led to a whole series of disputes. For their part, the Counts of Salm-Rheineck sought to bring Treis along with its environs under their yoke. As early as 1121, Heinrich V destroyed the castle to support Count Palatine Gottfried von Calw. Apparently, Otto von Salm had only just had the castle newly built. In the struggle waged by Otto II von Rheineck (Otto von Salm's son) against Hermann von Stahleck over the Rhenish Electoral Palatinate, Treis eventually fell under Electoral-Trier lordship in 1148, remaining there until the late 18th century.

Beginning in 1794, both centres lay under French rule. In 1815 they were assigned to the Kingdom of Prussia at the Congress of Vienna. Since 1946, they have been part of the then newly founded state of Rhineland-Palatinate. On 7 June 1969, the two centres, until then each a separate municipality, were merged to form the new municipality of Treis-Karden.

== Politics ==
=== Municipal council ===
The council is made up of 16 council members, who were elected at the municipal election held on 7 June 2009, and the honorary mayor as chairman.

The municipal election held on 7 June 2009 yielded the following results:

Year	SPD	CDU	FDP	Total
2009	5	9	2	16 seats
2004	5	10	1	16 seats

=== Mayor ===
Since 2019, Hans-Josef Bleser (CDU) is Treis-Karden's mayor. He succeeded Philipp Thönnes (CDU).

=== Coat of arms ===
The German blazon reads: Wappen geviert. In Feld 1: ein goldener Stern in Schwarz, in Feld 2: im goldenen Feld ein roter Einhenkelkrug, in Feld 3: eine blaue Lilie in silbernem Feld, in Feld 4: in schwarzem Feld ein goldener Hammer, umwunden von zwei goldenen Schlangen.

The municipality's arms might in English heraldic language be described thus: Quarterly, first sable a mullet of five Or, second Or a jug with one handle to sinister gules, third argent a fleur-de-lis azure, and fourth sable a hammer palewise coiled in opposite directions around which two serpents of the second.

The mullet (star shape) can already be found in the 1519 Treis court seal; it was also borne as a charge by the Castle Counts (Burggrafen) of Treis. The one-handled jug refers to the potter's craft, which was practised throughout Roman times in Karden. Several pieces of this kind can be found in the Foundation museum. The lily appears in the seal of the Collegiate Foundation in Karden from the latter half of the 13th century; it also refers to Mary, the church's former patron. The hammer with two snakes wound onto it refers to the arms borne by the family Broy in Karden. It can be found on several tomb slabs and the winged altar in the Foundation church, as well as on the door lintel of the so-called Burghaus.

In 1977, municipal council commissioned heraldic artist A. Friderichs and local historian H. Ritter to submit designs for a coat of arms. At a session on 18 July of that year, council chose the design that the municipality now bears as its arms, although they insisted on a slight modification to the charge in the second quartering, which was originally to have been an amphora. The arms have been borne since 14 February 1978.

== Culture and sightseeing ==
=== Buildings ===
The following are listed buildings or sites in Rhineland-Palatinate’s Directory of Cultural Monuments:

==== Karden ====
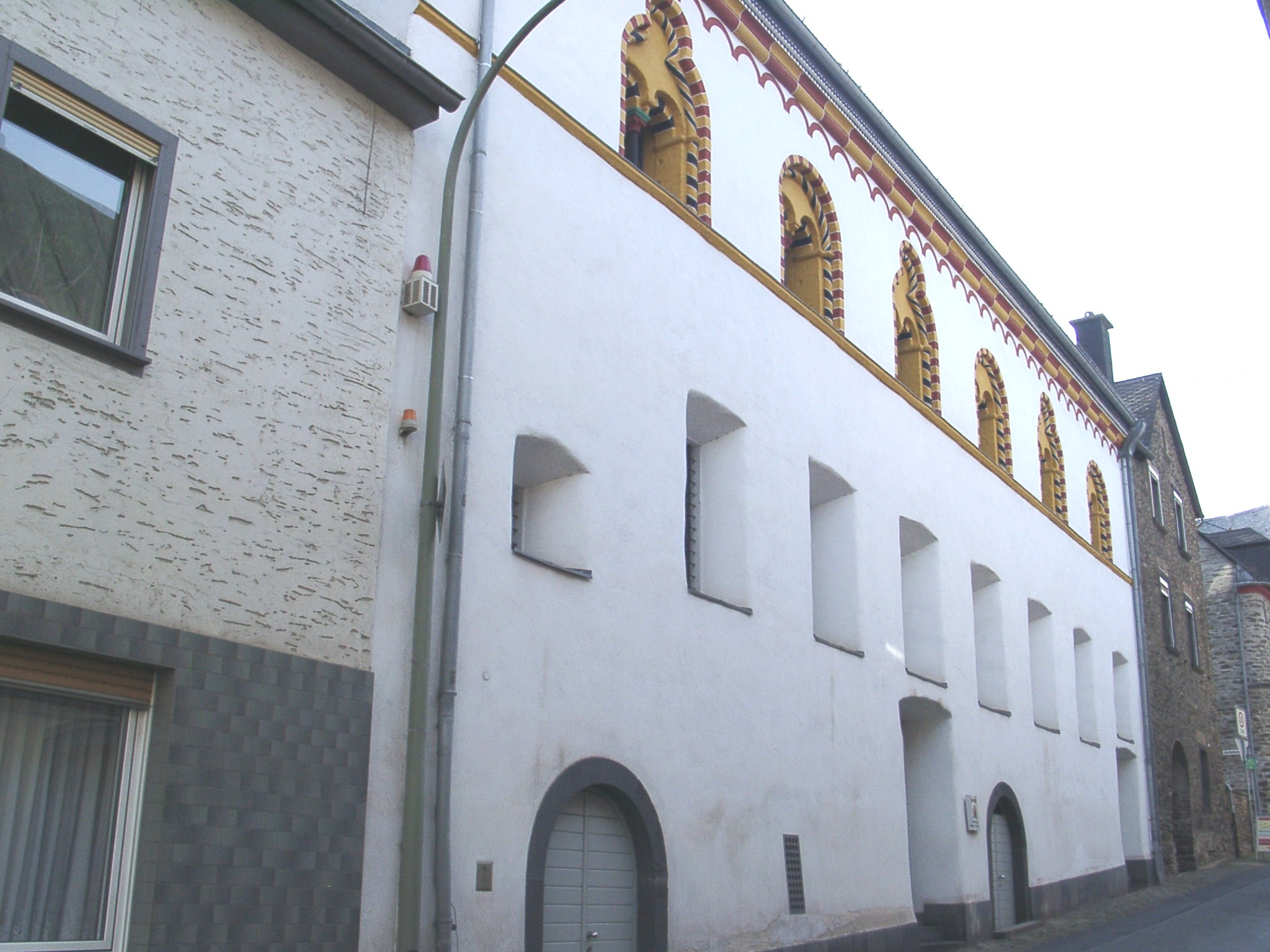
Karden, Kernstraße 8–10: former Foundation lords building

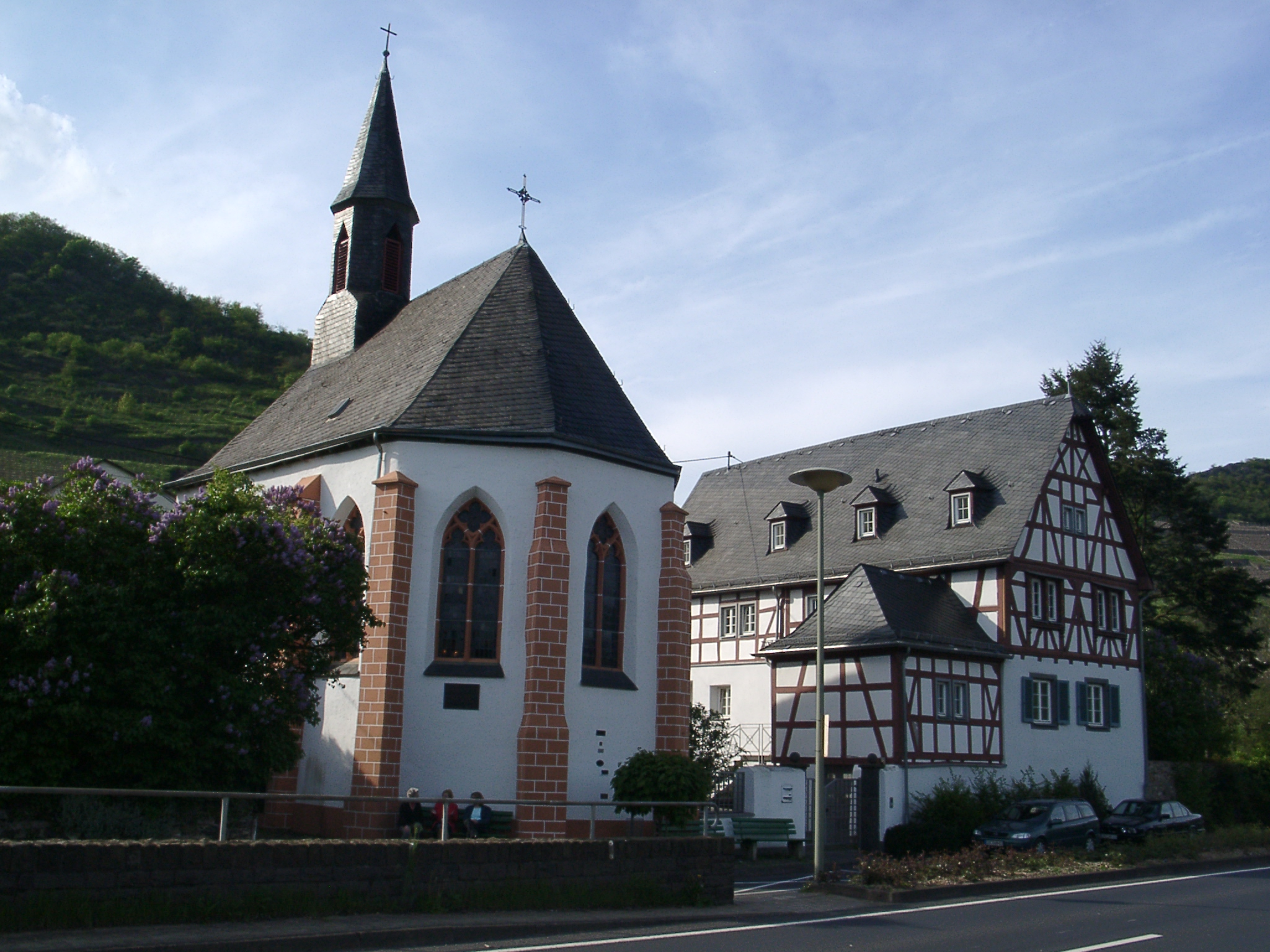
Karden, Moselstraße 33: Evangelical church (Georgskapelle)

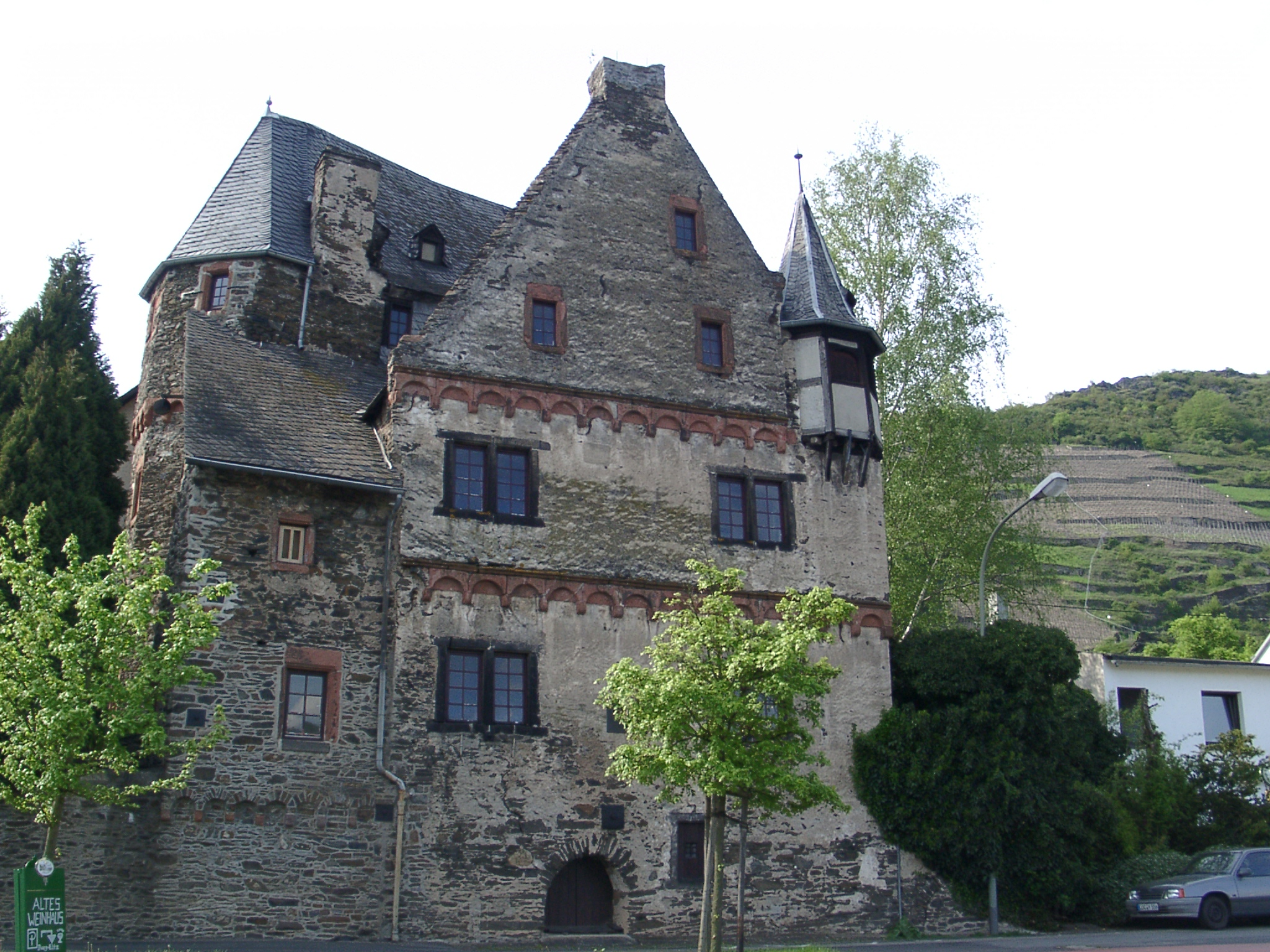
Karden, Moselstraße 18: former Electoral-Trier Amtshaus

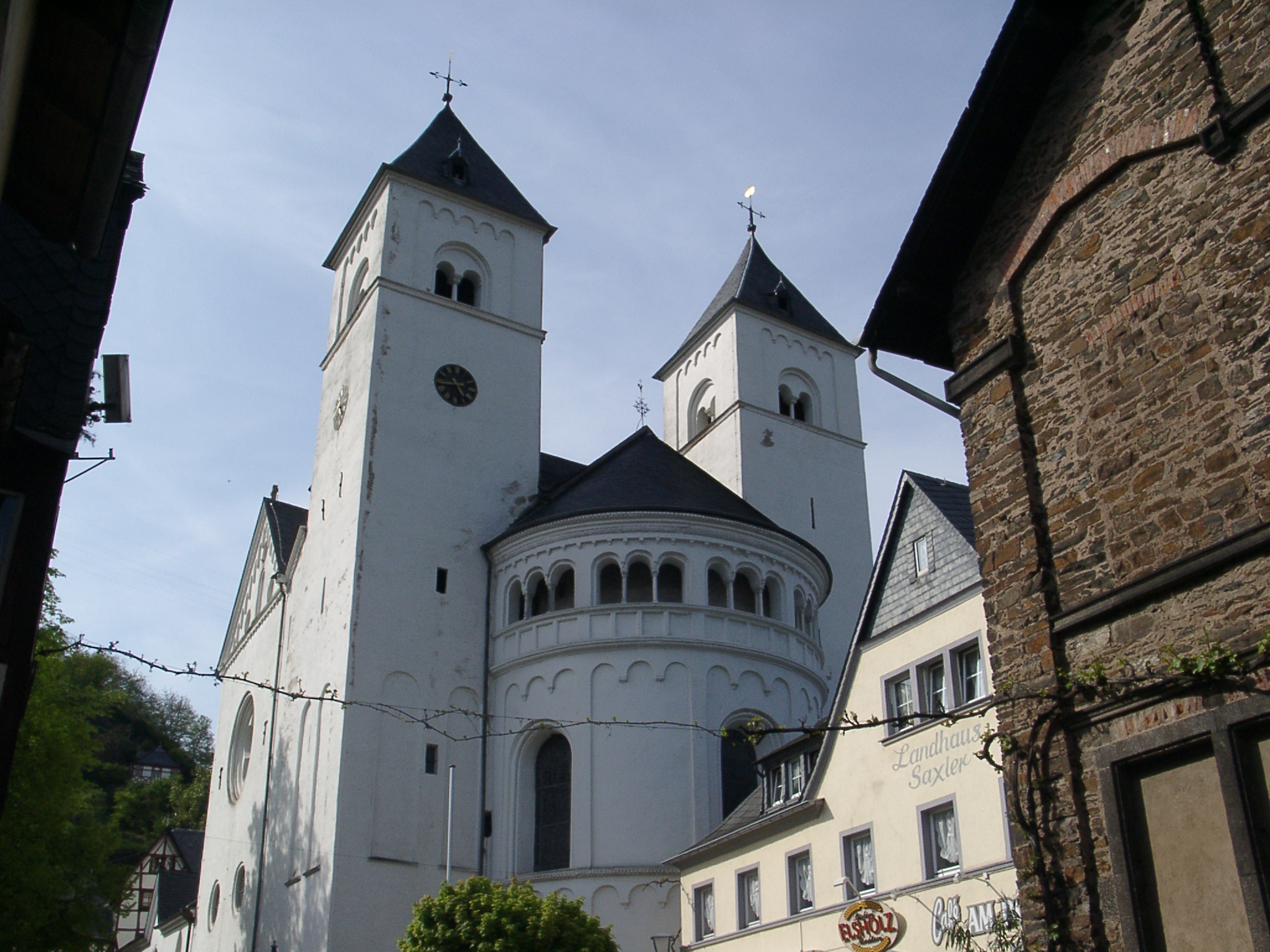
Karden, St.-Castor-Straße: former Saint Castor’s Foundation Church

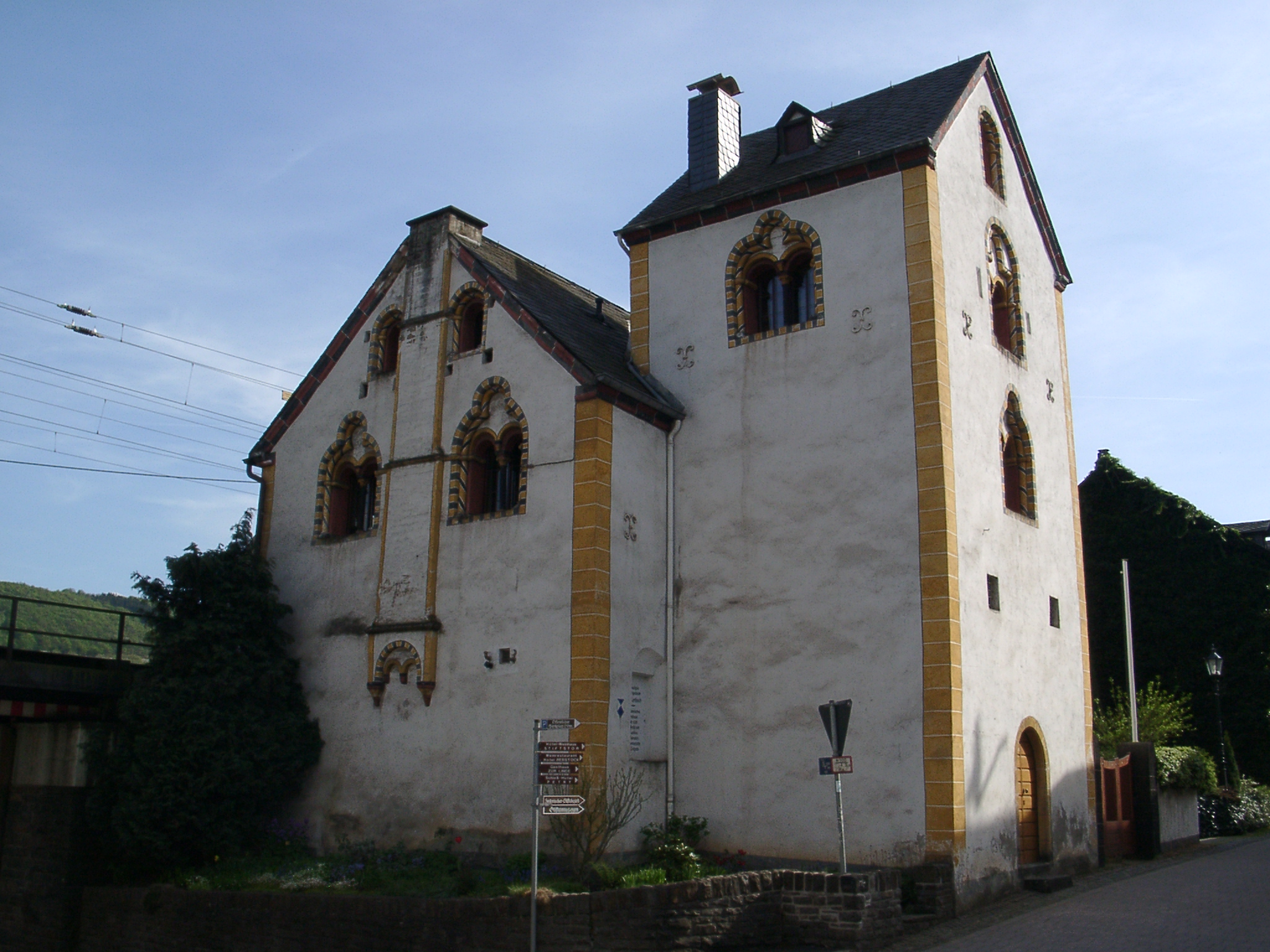
Karden, St.-Castor-Straße 1: Haus Korbisch

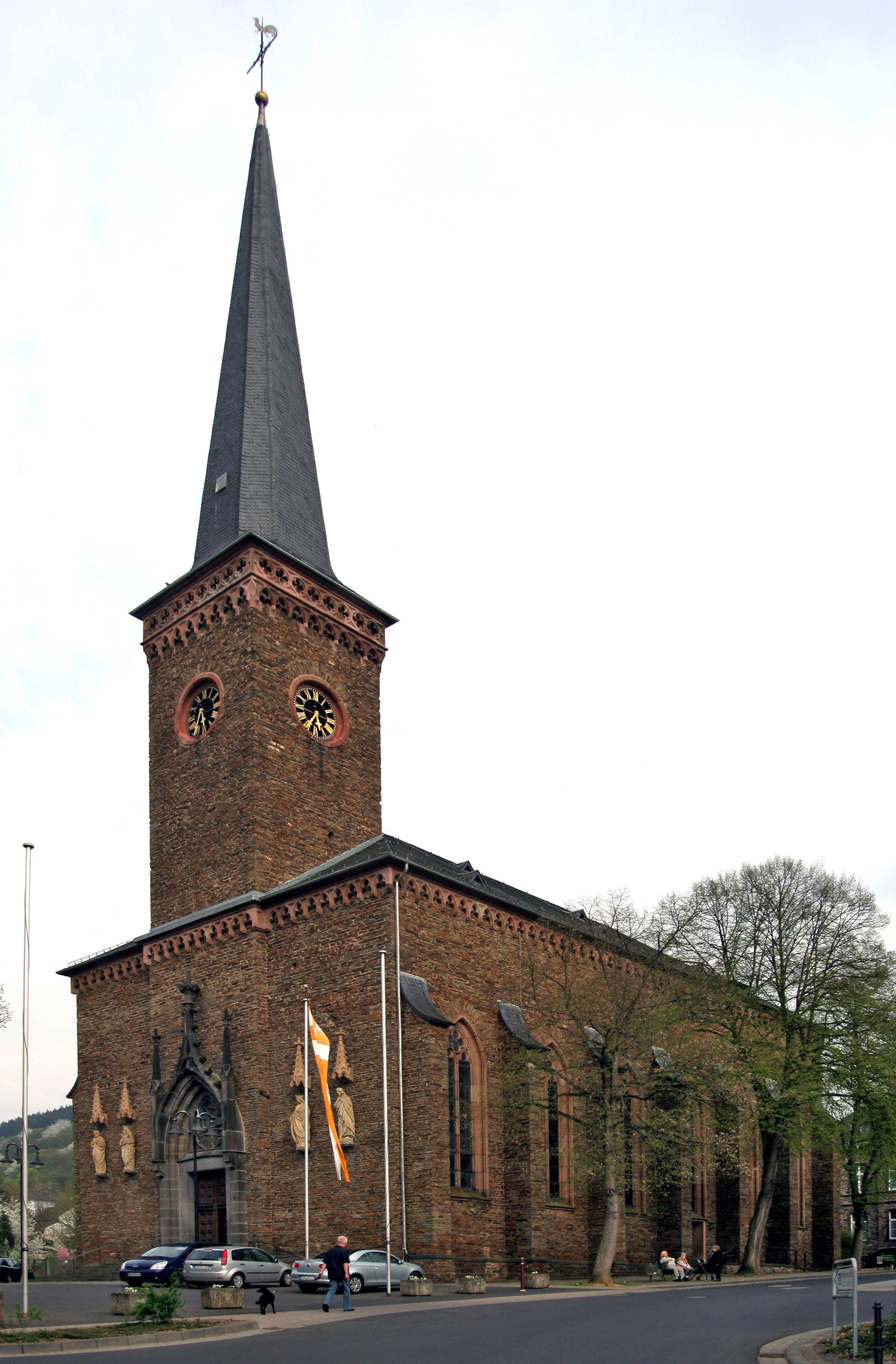
Treis, Am Plenzer: Saint John the Baptist’s Catholic Parish Church

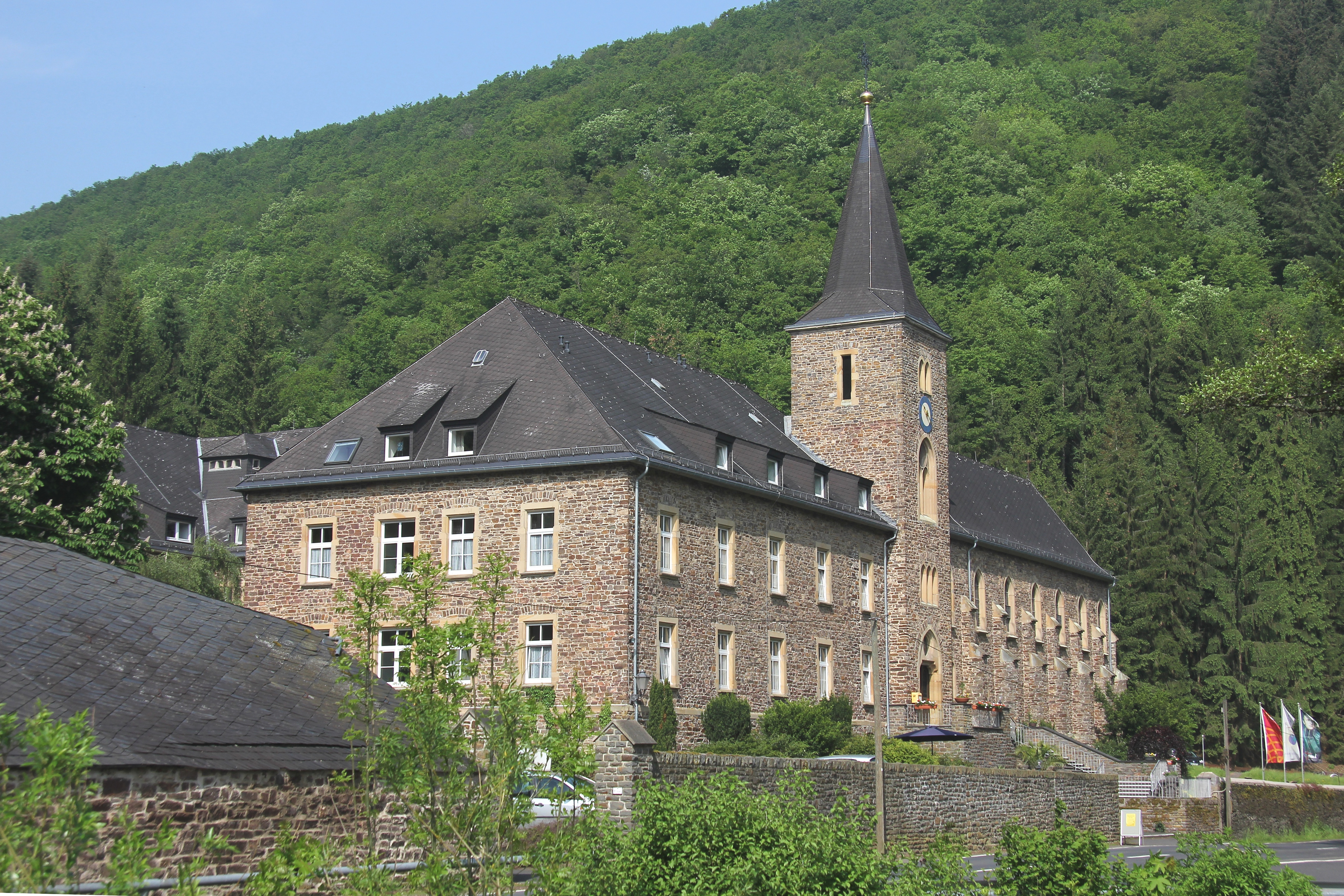
Former Premonstratensian convent of Maria Engelport in Treis

- Former Saint Castor’s Foundation Church, St.-Castor-Straße – whole complex with cloister and Foundation museum
- Evangelical church (Georgskapelle), Moselstraße 33 – Gothic aisleless church, mid 14th century
- Hochkreuzkapelle (“High Cross Chapel”) with Stations of the Cross, Kastellauner Straße – chapel, aisleless church, marked 1754, inside Crucifixion group, 18th century; Way of the Cross, Bildstock type with relief, 19th century
- Saint Castor's Foundation zone (monumental zone) – from buildings’ condition and bordering still a complex that can well be made out with buildings surrounding the former Saint Castor's Foundation Church used by the Foundation lords and the canons, the Haus Korbisch (former provostry building), former Foundation school and former dormitory stretching to the Brohlbach flowing behind it and down to the Electoral-Trier Amtshaus on the Moselle
- Am Buttermarkt 2 – L-shaped complex; timber-frame house, partly solid, plastered, marked 1631; front wing, 18th century; whole complex
- Am Buttermarkt 6 – former Foundation gate; three-floor timber-frame house, partly solid, balloon frame, dendrochronologically dated to 1310, corner stud dendrochronologically dated to 1516 ± 5 years
- Kernstraße 5 – timber-frame house, partly solid, 18th century
- Kernstraße 8-10 – former Foundation lords’ building (possibly refectory/dormitory) and refectory; Late Romanesque plastered building, dendrochronologically dated to 1238
- Kernstraße 9 – timber-frame house, partly solid, 18th century
- Kernstraße 18 – former Foundation school; timber-frame house, partly solid, Late Gothic crow-stepped gable (dendrochronologically dated to 1426/1427)
- Lindenplatz – Castor-Brunnen (fountain), 20th century
- Friedhof, Maximinstraße – three-floor Romanesque quarrystone tower of the old parish church, 13th century; eleven grave crosses from the 18th and 19th centuries; Crucifixion group, 18th century
- Moselstraße 18 – former Electoral-Trier Amtshaus; quarrystone building, timber-frame oriel turret, staircase, 1562
- Moselstraße 27 – villa; Late Historicist quarrystone building, hipped mansard roof, about 1900; whole complex with garden
- Moselstraße 32 – timber-frame house, partly solid, marked 1464 (?), 1686; on uphill side balloon frame construction, essentially possibly from the 16th century, side facing the Moselle from the 17th century; garden with garden wall; whole complex
- Between Moselstraße 37 and 38 – Crucifixion group, Baroque Revival niche, marked 1907, with Baroque Crucifixion group, 18th century
- Römerstraße 28 – archaeological collection from Roman times and the Middle Ages
- St.-Castor-Straße – railway station; two-winged building with hipped mansard roof or half-hipped roof, 1910; whole complex with tracks
- St.-Castor-Straße 1 – Haus Korbisch; Late Romanesque plastered building with twinned windows and tower; the central part dendrochronologically dated to 941 ± 10 years, re-built with the late Romanesque windows in 1207/08.
- St.-Castor-Straße 3 – quarrystone building, mid 19th century
- St.-Castor-Straße 7 – timber-frame house, partly solid, 17th century, on ground floor mediaeval fragments
- St.-Castor-Straße 9/11 – solid building, in the back timber-frame house, partly solid, balloon frame, dendrochronologically dated to 1495; addition, partly timber-frame, 16th century
- St.-Castor-Straße 10 – solid building, partly timber-frame, crow-stepped gable, 16th century
- St.-Castor-Straße 14 – Baroque building with hipped mansard roof, marked 1765, winepress house
- St.-Castor-Straße 17 – timber-frame house (towards back), partly solid, 18th century
- St.-Castor-Straße 23 – timber-frame house, partly solid, balloon frame, marked 1587
- St.-Castor-Straße 28 – former school; stately quarrystone building, marked 1909
- St.-Castor-Straße 31 – timber-frame house, partly solid, half-hipped roof, marked 1759
- St.-Castor-Straße 33 – timber-frame house, partly solid, plastered and sided, half-hipped roof, 18th century
- St.-Castor-Straße 34 – timber-frame house, partly solid, latter half of 16th century, remodelled in 17th century
- St.-Castor-Straße 42 – stately building with hipped roof, 18th century; whole complex with garden
- St.-Castor-Straße 48 – timber-frame house, partly solid, half-hipped roof, marked 1614
- St.-Castor-Straße 74/76 – timber-frame house, partly solid, plastered, mansard roof, 18th century (?)
- St.-Castor-Straße 86 – Schlosshotel Petri; two- to three-floor L-shaped plastered building, essentially from the 17th century (?), wing facing the Moselle with crow-stepped gable, 19th century; whole complex with old wall
- St.-Castor-Straße 109 – plastered building on high quarrystone pedestal, staircase, 1920s/1930s
- St.-Castor-Straße/corner of Maximinstraße – Madonna, 19th century
- Vineyard house – timber-frame bungalow with half-hipped roof, towards 1910
- Gillesmühle – Bildstock, relief, 18th century
- Above St. Goar, marked by a prominent white cross – Saint Castor's Cave, grotto with kneeling Christ, 18th or 19th century
- Windhäuser Höfe (estates) on Kreisstraße 31 – Gothic Revival chapel; inside, Gothic Revival Crucifixion group

==== Treis ====
- Saint John the Baptist's Catholic Parish Church (Pfarrkirche St. Johann Baptist), Am Plenzer – Gothic Revival hall church, quarrystone, 1823–1831, architect Johann Claudius von Lassaulx, Koblenz
- Am Rathaus 2 – quire of the former Saint Catherine's Catholic Parish Church (Pfarrkirche St. Katharina), latter half of 15th century; grave cross, marked 1527
- Am Markt 8 – timber-frame house, partly solid (solid building with timber-frame façade?), half-hipped roof, marked 1637
- Am Plenzer 1 – former boys’ school; quarrystone building, hipped roof, about 1834, architect Johann Claudius von Lassaulx
- Am Plenzer 5 – Gothic Revival quarrystone building, mid 19th century
- Am Rathaus 4 – quarrystone building, mid 19th century; whole complex of buildings with quarrystone commercial building
- Am Rathaus 5/6 – former rectory; quarrystone building, about 1830/1840, architect Johann Claudius von Lassaulx, with pilaster strips and broad arch frieze; no. 5 winepress house; in the wall four grave crosses, 1747, 1615, 1614, fragment 1733; whole complex of buildings with barn and garden
- Breitbrücke – one-arch quarrystone bridge, essentially Baroque, mid 19th century faced by Johann Claudius von Lassaulx
- Brückenstraße 29 – former weights and measures office; one-floor quarrystone building, 1889
- Burg Treis (castle) – quarrystone keep, between 1152 and 1169, great parts of the fortification, gate, Burgmannenhaus, residential quarters and heated room of the castle complex founded in the 11th century
- Castorgasse 7 – three-floor timber-frame house, partly solid, marked 1819, timber framing marked 1718
- Castorgasse 13 – see Hauptstraße 16
- Castorgasse 14 – building with mansard roof, timber framing plastered, marked 1766
- Fischergasse 1 – timber-frame house, partly solid, marked 1561, remodelled in the 18th century
- Fischergasse 12 – timber-frame house, partly solid, plastered, essentially from the 16th or 17th century
- Hauptstraße – water cistern; one-floor Baroque Revival quarrystone building with tower, marked 1903
- Hauptstraße 10 – Classicist timber-frame house, partly solid, plastered, marked 1819
- Hauptstraße 15 – two houses; solid building, 17th century; timber-frame house, partly solid, half-hipped roof, early 17th century, essentially possibly older, driveway with timber-frame bridge
- Hauptstraße 16 – L-shaped complex; spacious timber-frame house, partly solid, plastered, mansard roof, marked 1815
- Hauptstraße 27 – Altes Rathaus (Old Town Hall); Gothic Revival quarrystone building, crow-stepped gable, Gothic Revival niche Madonna, 19th century; characterizes village's appearance
- Johannesstraße 6 – quarrystone building, 19th century
- Kastellauner Straße – basalt wayside cross, marked 1637
- Katharinenstraße 27 – timber-frame house, partly solid, plastered, 17th century
- Kirchberger Straße/corner of Forststraße – graveyard with old girding wall, at which two gravestones, 19th century; basalt graveyard cross on altar block, marked 1716, two attendant figures, 18th century; graveyard chapel, quarrystone building, 19th century; “Vesper”, 19th or 20th century
- Kirchstraße 7 – building with hipped mansard roof, timber framing plastered, 18th century
- Laygasse 13 – spacious quarrystone building, hipped roof, 19th century
- Mittelstraße 1 – timber-frame house, partly solid, essentially from the 16th century
- Moselallee 2 – quarrystone villa, partly timber-frame, about 1900
- Rainstraße 15 – timber-frame house, partly solid, plastered, essentially from the 16th or 17th century
- Rainstraße 19 – timber-frame house, partly solid, plastered, half-hipped roof, essentially possibly from the 16th century
- Wehrgasse 5 – three-floor timber-frame house, partly solid, mansard roof, 18th century
- Wildburg (castle) – residential quarters, keep, possibly before 1122; whole complex
- On Kreisstraße 35, way out of the village going towards Bruttig-Fankel – wayside chapel; quarrystone building, 1932
- On Kreisstraße 35, going towards Bruttig-Fankel – Gothic Revival wayside cross; about 1900, mosaic from the 1950s
- On Kreisstraße 35, going towards Bruttig-Fankel – basalt wayside cross; 18th century
- On Landesstraße 108, way out of the village – Baroque cross
- Beurenhof – timber-frame chapel, 17th or 18th century
- Flaumbachtal 4 – former Premonstratensian convent of Maria Engelport; two-naved basilica and new convent wing, quarrystone, 1903–1905; from the old complex girding wall the church consecrated in 1272 and old wing, 16th or 17th century; coat of arms, marked 1716; quarrystone commercial wing; grotto, 1915; on the way to the graveyard sculptures; at the graveyard cast-iron cross, Rheinböllen foundry, latter half of 19th century
- Honshäuserhof – votive cross, marked 1936
- Zilskapelle St. Johann Baptist (chapel), formerly St. Cyriakus; aisleless church, early 17th century; outside, two reliefs, marked 1783; pilgrimage cross, marked 1845; 14 Gothic Revival Stations of the Cross, stele form, Bildstock type, 19th century, beginning with chapel with grotto, 18th century, inside, Christ on the Mount of Olives, 18th century; whole complex with Way of the Cross

The name of the building Haus Korbisch is a corruption of the German word Chorbischof (“canonical bishop”).

=== Museums ===
- The former Saint Castor's Foundation Church (Stiftskirche St. Castor) in Karden (originally a Romanesque building) is said to be the Moseldom (“Moselle Cathedral”). A Foundation museum recalls the greatness of the village's past.

== Economy and infrastructure ==
=== Transport ===
Karden railway station is served by Regional-Express trains running between Koblenz, Trier and Saarbrücken.

== Gallery ==
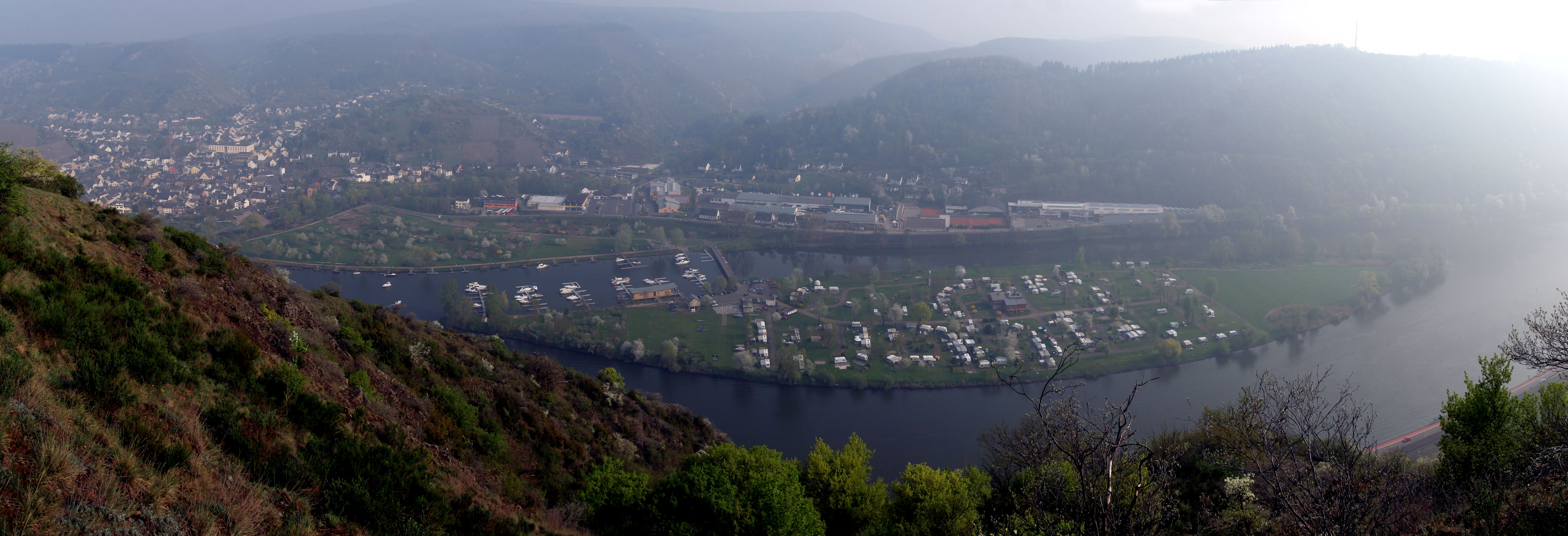
Panorama of Treis with the Moselle island seen from the Martberg

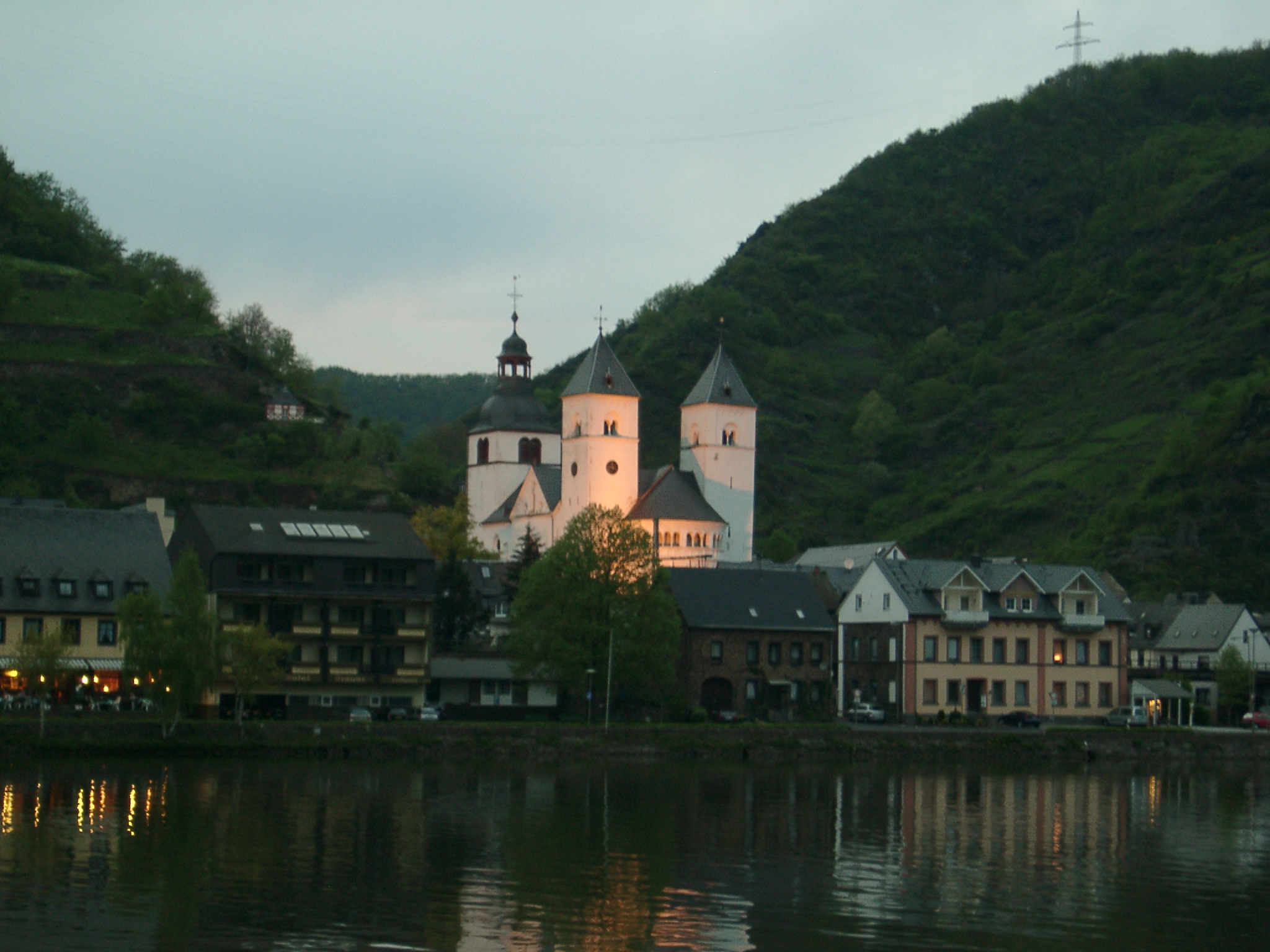
Karden from the far side of the Moselle

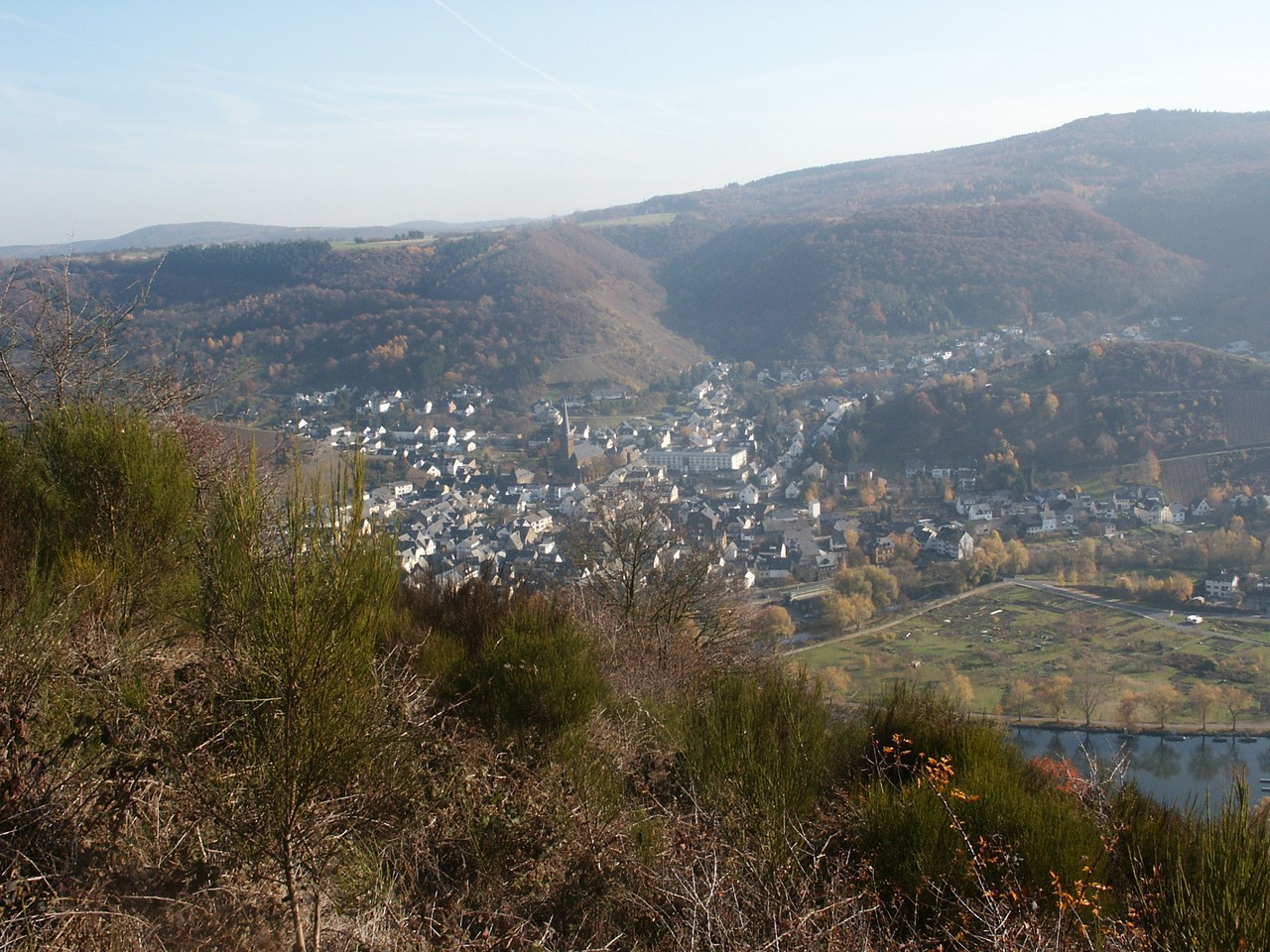
View from the Martberg of Treis; in the middle Saint John the Baptist's Church

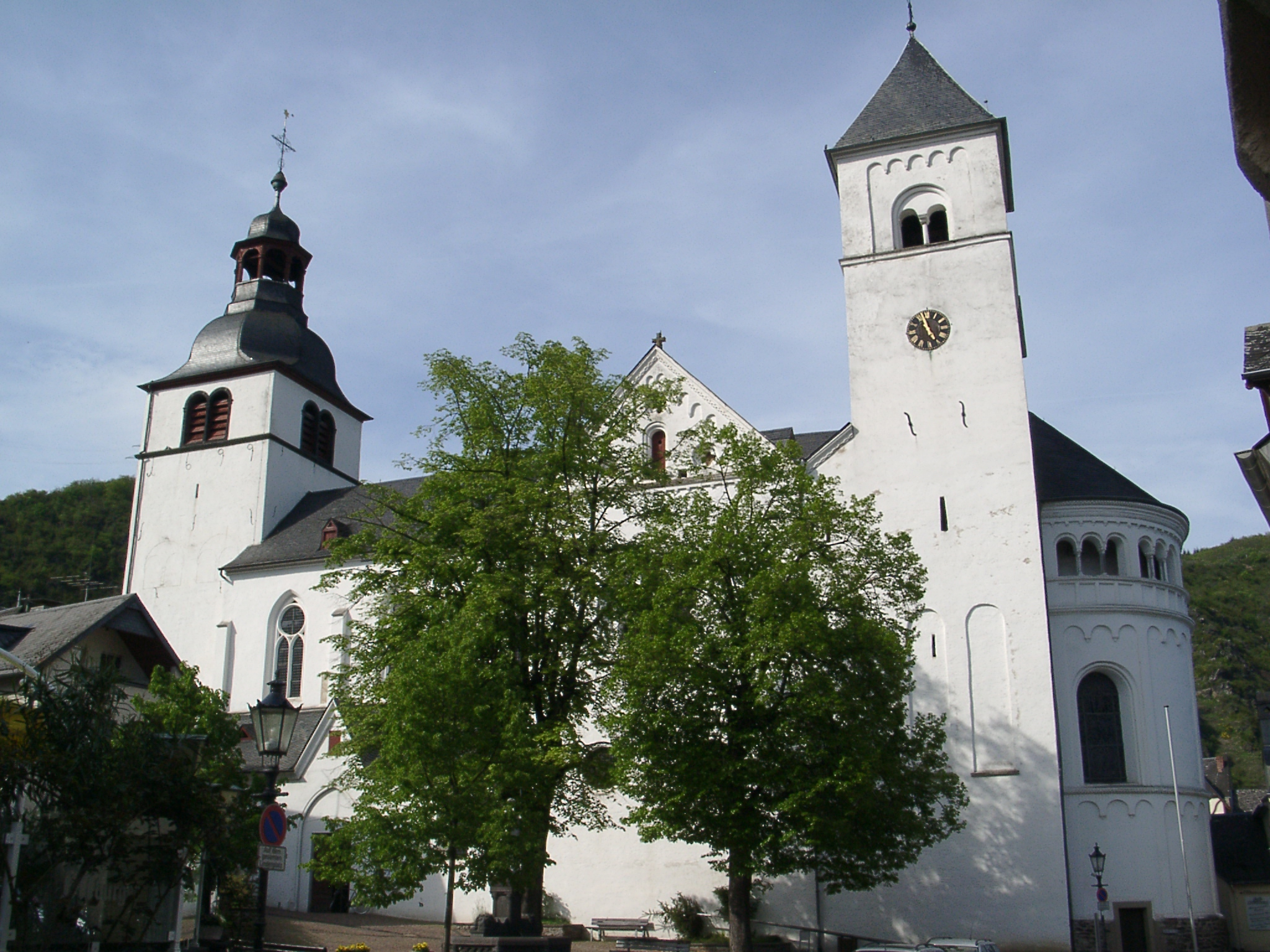
Karden Foundation Church

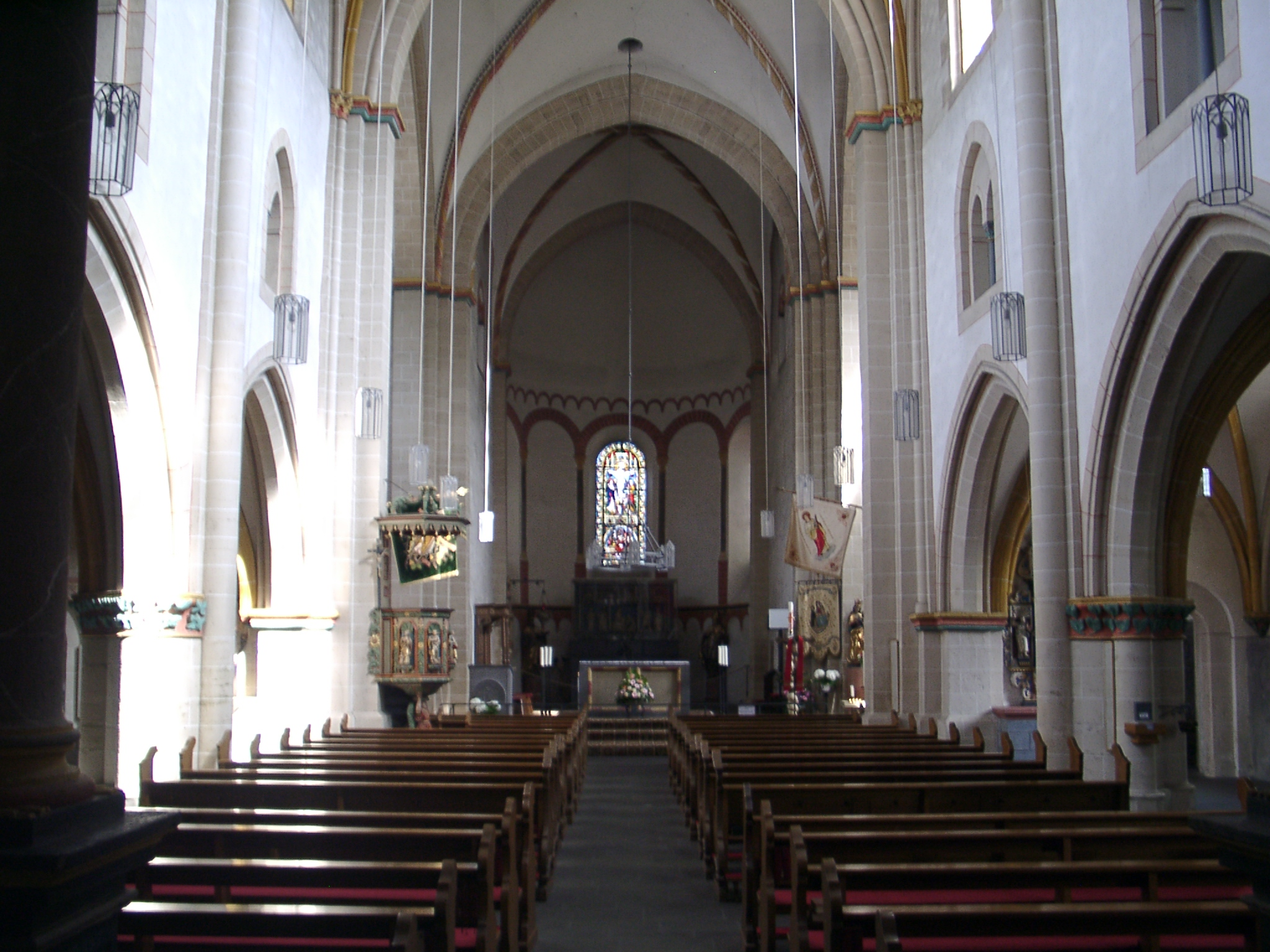
Inside the “Moselle Cathedral”

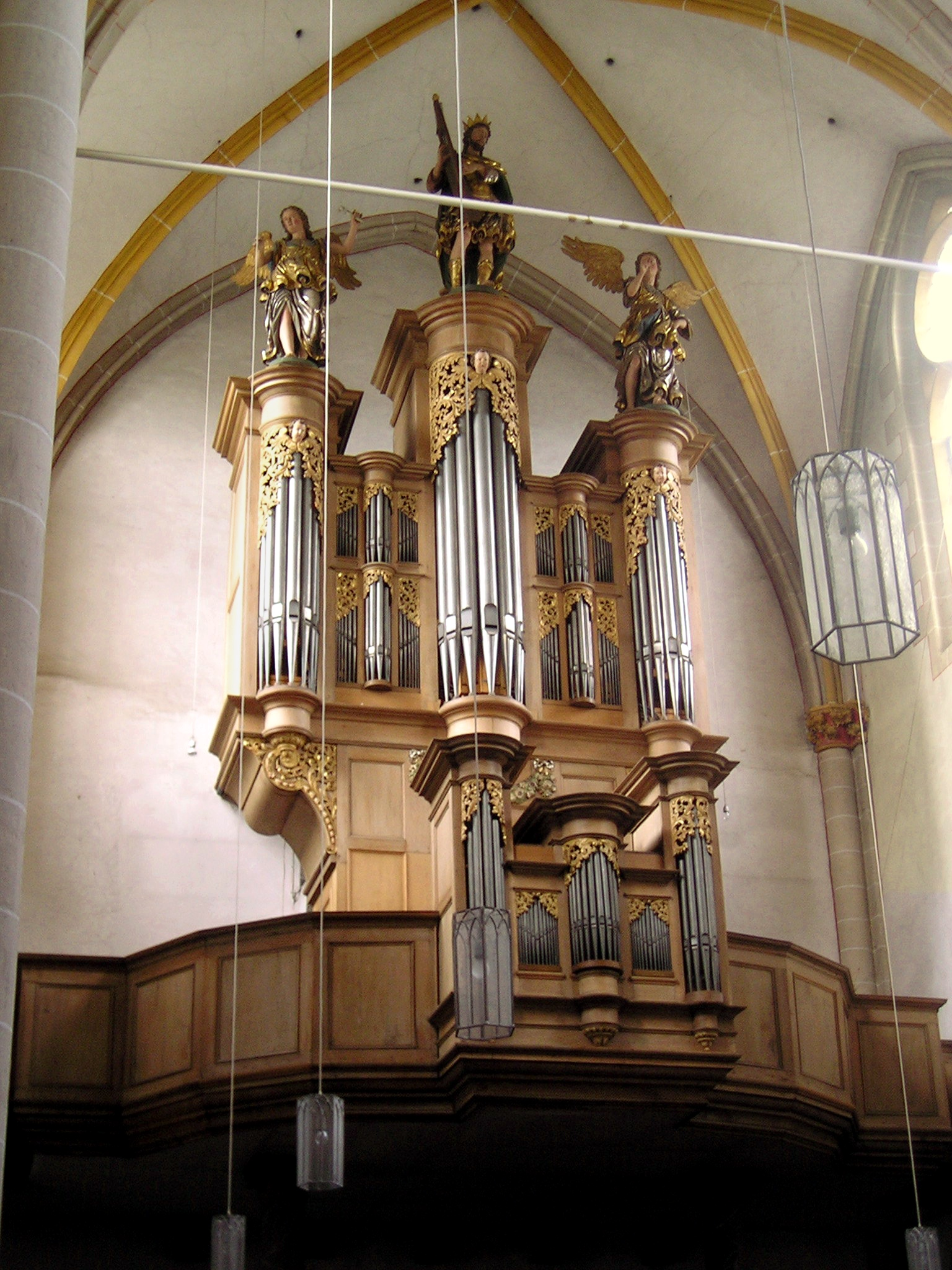
The historical Stumm organ from 1728
