= Routh =

Routh may refer to:

== Places ==
- Routh, East Riding of Yorkshire, England, UK; a village in Yorkshire
- Ann Rouths House, Beverley, East Riding of Yorkshire, Yorkshire, England, UK; one of the Grade II* listed buildings in the East Riding of Yorkshire
- Routh Mounds, Tensas Parish, Louisiana, USA; an archaeological site
- Routh-Bailey House or Routh House, Old Wire Road, Fayetteville, Arkansas, USA; an NRHP-listed house built by Benjamin Routh in 1850
- Routh Street, Dallas, Texas, USA; part of the Good-Latimer Expressway

== People ==
- Routh Goshen (1824–1889), a tall Manxman who performed in human oddity shows, advertised as the tallest man in the world
- Sanjiv Routh Sarkar (born 1986), Indian musician
- Routh family, who owned plantations and slaves in Louisiana and Mississippi

=== Persons with the surname ===
- Bernard Routh or Bernard Rothe (1694–1768), Irish Jesuit
- Brandon Routh (born 1979), American actor
- Brian Routh (1948–2018), UK performance artist
- Camilla Belle Routh (born 1986), American actress
- Colin Routh, a member of the band 'Black Lace'
- C. R. N. Routh, wrote the 1990 biographical dictionary Who's Who in Tudor England 1485-1603
- David "Shorty" Routh, who designed the racing sailboat design Puddle Duck Racer
- Edward John Routh (1831–1907), British mathematician
- Eddie Ray Routh (born 1987), American convicted murderer
- Francis John Routh (1927–2021), English composer and author
- Guy Routh or Gerald Guy Cumming Routh (1916–1993), South African British economist
- Haviland Routh (1871–1959), Canadian ice hockey player
- Jane Routh, UK poet
- Jhareswar Routh, Indian politician who participated in the 2021 election for Keshiary Assembly constituency, West Bengal Legislative Assembly, India
- Jonathan Routh (1927–2008), British humourist
- Josh Routh (born 1978), contemporary American circus artist
- Malcolm Routh Jameson (1891–1945), U.S. writer
- Marc Routh, U.S. theatre producer
- Martin Joseph Routh, or Martin Routh (1755–1854), British classical scholar
- Martha Routh (1743–1817), UK Quaker minister and writer
- Mary Routh McEnery Stuart or Ruth Stuart (1849–1917), U.S. writer
- May Routh or Ida May Routh (1934–2022), Indian-British-American costume designer
- Randolph Isham Routh (1782–1858), knighted British army officer
- Ryan Wesley Routh, U.S. citizen suspected to be the perpetrator of the attempted assassination of Donald Trump in Florida

== Other uses ==
- Operation Routh, a 2011 operation against the Rochdale child sex abuse ring

== See also ==
- Samman baronets of Routh; a baronetcy based in Routh, Yorkshire, England, UK
- Routh array for calculating stability
- Routh's procedure in classical mechanics
- Routh's theorem in geometry
- Rothe (surname)
- Roth (disambiguation)
- Ruth (disambiguation)
