= Roth =

Roth may refer to:

== Places ==
=== Germany ===
- Roth (district), in Bavaria, Germany
  - Roth, Bavaria, capital of that district
  - Roth (electoral district), a federal electoral district
- Rhineland-Palatinate, Germany:
  - Roth an der Our, in the district Bitburg-Prüm
  - Roth bei Prüm, in the district Bitburg-Prüm
  - Roth, Altenkirchen, in the district of Altenkirchen
  - Roth, Bad Kreuznach, in the district of Bad Kreuznach
  - Roth, Rhein-Hunsrück, in the district Rhein-Hunsrück
  - Roth, Rhein-Lahn, in the district Rhein-Lahn-Kreis

=== France ===
- Roth, Moselle, a village in the commune of Hambach, Moselle

=== United States ===
- Roth, North Dakota, a community
- Roth, Virginia, a community

== Rivers ==
- Roth (Danube), a river of Bavaria, Germany, tributary of the Danube
- Roth (Rednitz), a river of Bavaria, Germany, tributary of the Rednitz
- Roth (Zusam), a river of Bavaria, Germany, tributary of the Zusam
- Rot (Apfelstädt), a river also called Roth, of Thuringia, Germany, tributary of the Apfelstädt

== People ==
- Roth (surname)
- Roth McElvain, American politician
- Roth, formal botanical abbreviation for Albrecht Wilhelm Roth (1757–1834), German physician and botanist

== Fictional characters ==
- Cooper Roth, Marvel Comics superhero
- Hyman Roth, fictional character in the film The Godfather Part II
- Margo Roth Spiegelman, a prominent character in YA novel Paper Towns
- Rachel Roth, alias for DC Comics superhero Raven

== Other uses ==
- Challenge Roth, a long-distance triathlon race
- Daniel Roth (watchmakers), watch making company
- Roth IRA or Roth 401(k), tax-advantaged retirement savings accounts in the U.S.
- Roth Industries, German company based in Dautphetal
- Realms of the Haunting, a computer game

== See also ==
- Rothe
