= Braunshorn =

- Municipality
- Coat of arms

- Location of Braunshorn within Rhein-Hunsrück-Kreis district
- Interactive map of Braunshorn
- Location within Germany Location within Rhineland-Palatinate
- Coordinates: 50°5′32″N 7°31′07″E
- Country: Germany
- State: Rhineland-Palatinate
- District: Rhein-Hunsrück-Kreis
- Municipal assoc.: Kastellaun

Government
  - Mayor (2019–24): Markus Becker

Area
  - Total: 6.98 km^{2} (2.69 sq mi)
- Elevation: 475 m (1,558 ft)

Population (2025-12-31)
  - Total: 688
  - Density: 98.6/km^{2} (255/sq mi)
- Time zone: UTC+01:00 (CET)
  - Summer (DST): UTC+02:00 (CEST)
- Postal codes: 56288
- Dialling codes: 06746
- Vehicle registration: SIM
- Website: www.braunshorn.de

Braunshorn is an Ortsgemeinde – a municipality belonging to a Verbandsgemeinde, a kind of collective municipality – in the Rhein-Hunsrück-Kreis (district) in Rhineland-Palatinate, Germany. It belongs to the Verbandsgemeinde of Kastellaun, whose seat is in the like-named town.

== Geography ==
=== Location ===
The municipality lies in the Hunsrück some 18 km west of Oberwesel and one kilometre east of Gödenroth.

=== Constituent communities ===
The municipality's namesake is the village of Braunshorn, one of three Ortsteile in the municipality. The two others are Dudenroth and Ebschied.

== History ==
Braunshorn's and Dudenroth's founders were the Lords of Braunshorn, about 1090, one of whose lordly seats was the motte-and-bailey Castle Dudenroth, which can be regarded as the Hunsrück's oldest defensive complex. Indeed, in both places, remnants of such mediaeval castles can be found. In 1098 came Castle Dudenroth's first documentary mention; at this time it belonged to Gandolf von Braunshorn. The first church was mentioned in Heinrich von Braunshorn's time, in 1175. In 1268, the lordly family moved its seat to Beilstein.

Ebschied's beginnings, however, were somewhat different. It originally belonged to the Counts of Kessel on the Meuse. In 1295, it had its first documentary mention when the county's heirs found themselves at odds with each other. In this same year, Walram, the Provost at Münster, sold his village, Ebschied, to the Counts Palatine.

In 1352, Count Walram of Sponheim claimed comital rights in Ebschied, but because he would not comply with an arbiter's ruling on the matter, Ebschied was pillaged under threat of burning.

In 1363, when the House of Braunshorn had no further male heirs, Braunshorn passed by marriage to the Lords of Winneburg-Beilstein. In the 17th century, Braunshorn and Dudenroth both lay in the territory governed by the “Three-Lord Court”, whose seat was in Beltem (Beltheim). Territorial holdings in this area were divided among three houses: the Counts Palatine at Simmern, the House of Boos von Waldeck and the Counts of Braunshorn.

Before the Thirty Years' War, there were three hearths (for this read “households”) in the village of Braunshorn, according to records. From 1637 to 1794, the village of Braunshorn was held in fief by the Barons of Metternich. In 1599, Ebschied was recorded as having 11 “farmsteads”, which all belonged to Electoral Palatinate.

In 1784, the chapel in Saint Erasmus's honour in Ebschied was rebuilt.

In 1798, Braunshorn and Dudenroth found themselves in the French Mairie (“Mayoralty”) of Gödenroth, itself in the Canton of Castellaun within the Arrondissement of Simmern, which lay in the Department of Rhin-et-Moselle.

In 1804, the French Code civil des Français was introduced. On the night of 1 January 1814, Prussian troops under Marshal Gebhard Leberecht von Blücher advanced across the frozen Rhine near Kaub, freeing the lands on the Rhine's left bank from French rule; they declared it officially Prussian territory on 1 June 1815. This was also made official by the Congress of Vienna. In villages throughout the Hunsrück, the Prussian eagle was hoisted. Braunshorn and Dudenroth were now in the Bürgermeisterei (“Mayoralty”) of Pfalzfeld in the St. Goar district. Between 1830 and 1833, the old Braunshorn church was torn down and the fixtures were sold. Meanwhile, the church that still stands now was built.

The lands on the Rhine's left bank, and thereby the Hunsrück, too, were neglected in the 19th century as a border area, which showed up in the lack of trade and industry. Besides the provincial road from Boppard to Simmern, there were only poorly developed tracks linking individual villages with each other. The inhabitants’ main livelihood was in farming. This was not enough, though, to ensure a good family income by itself, for agricultural operations were usually quite small, and the soils were middling to poor in quality. In the winter months, there was supplemental income from work in the municipal forest. This was still not truly enough to afford the younger generations a basis for a sufficient livelihood. Therefore, many younger inhabitants went to the Cologne or Düsseldorf area, and sometimes the Ruhr area, too, to seek work. Many others, especially women, tried to earn themselves more money by going from town to town in the Rhineland selling Hunsrück wool and products from the small knitting mills that had meanwhile sprung up.

In the time of the Third Reich, road development finally came when the Hunsrückhöhenstraße (“Hunsrück Heights Road”, a scenic road across the Hunsrück built originally as a military road on Hermann Göring’s orders) was built in 1938, furnishing a link to this important road between Koblenz and Saarbrücken.

After the Second World War, Braunshorn was part of the French zone of occupation until 1947, since which time it has been part of the then newly founded state of Rhineland-Palatinate.

In the course of administrative restructuring in Rhineland-Palatinate, the until now self-administering municipalities of Braunshorn, Dudenroth and Ebschied were on 17 March 1974 amalgamated into one municipality, named Braunshorn.

== Politics ==
=== Municipal council ===
The council is made up of 12 council members, who were elected at the municipal election held on 7 June 2009, and the honorary mayor as chairman.

=== Mayor ===
Braunshorn's mayor is Markus Becker.

=== Coat of arms ===
The municipality's arms might be described thus: Gules three bugle-horns sans string argent.

== Culture and sightseeing ==
=== Buildings ===
The following are listed buildings or sites in Rhineland-Palatinate’s Directory of Cultural Monuments:

==== Braunshorn (main centre) ====
- Saint Mark's Catholic Church (Kirche St. Markus), Kirchweg 5 – three-naved quarrystone hall church, 1830–1833, architect Ferdinand Nebel, Koblenz; whole complex of buildings with graveyard
- Zur Alten Burg, motte-and-bailey castle (monumental zone) – undated round motte with surrounding wall

==== Dudenroth ====
- Birkenstraße – Saint Sebastian’s Chapel (St.-Sebastian-Kapelle); square chapel, 1950s; hand pump, Rheinböllen Ironworks, late 19th century

==== Ebschied ====
- Hauptstraße – Saint Erasmus's Chapel (St.-Erasmus-Kapelle); Baroque aisleless church
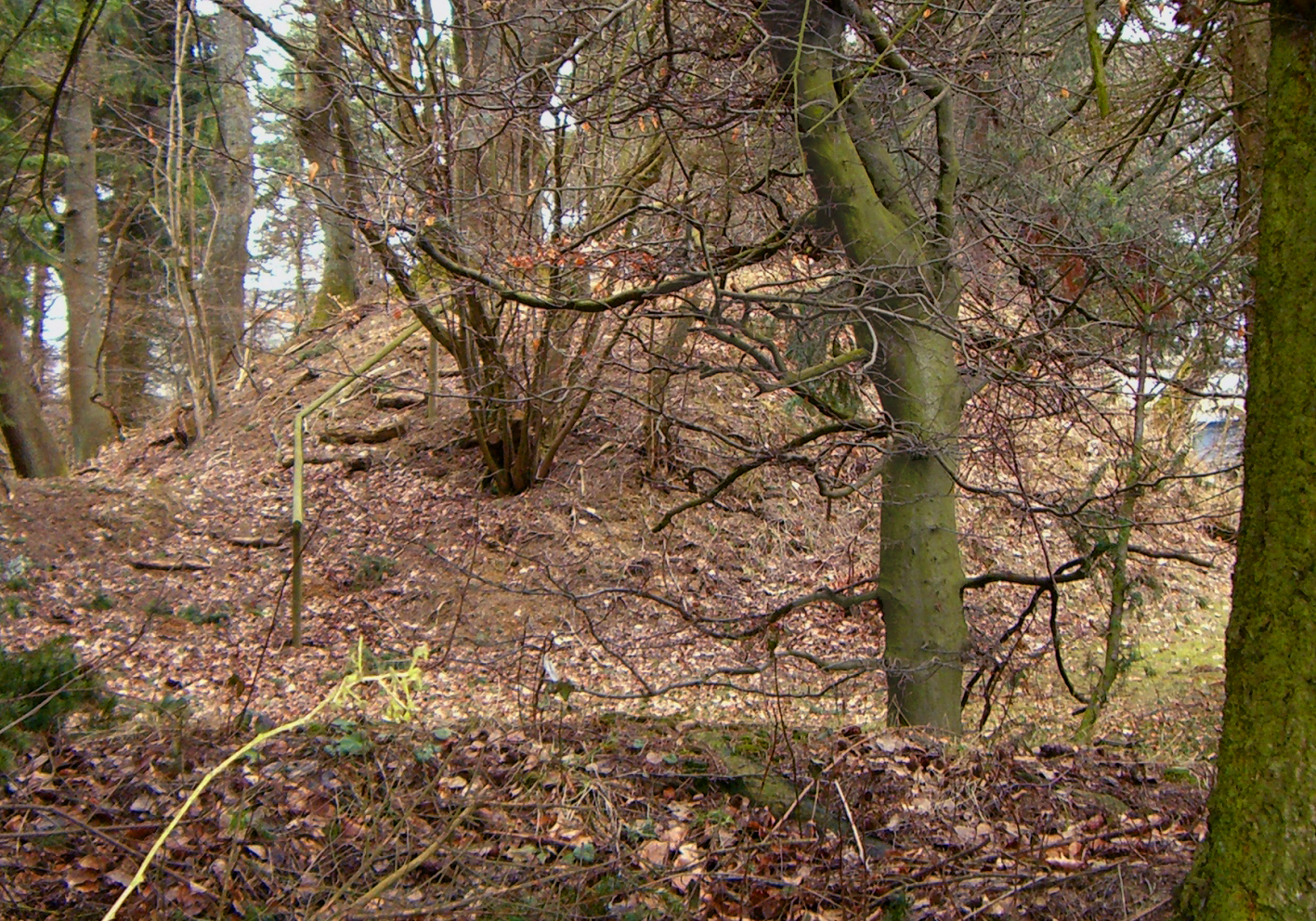
Zur Alten Burg monumental zone

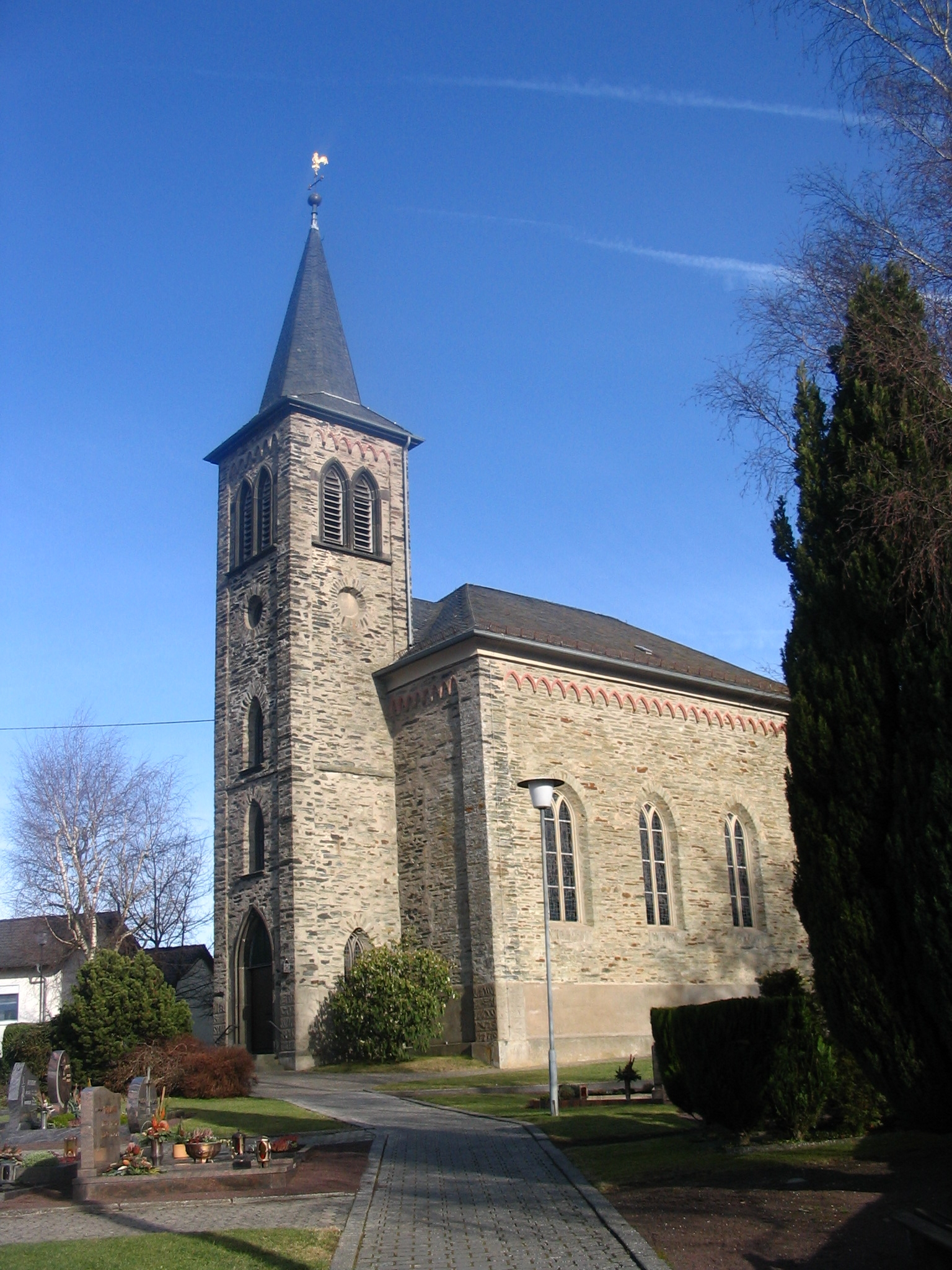
Kirchweg 5: Saint Mark's Catholic Church

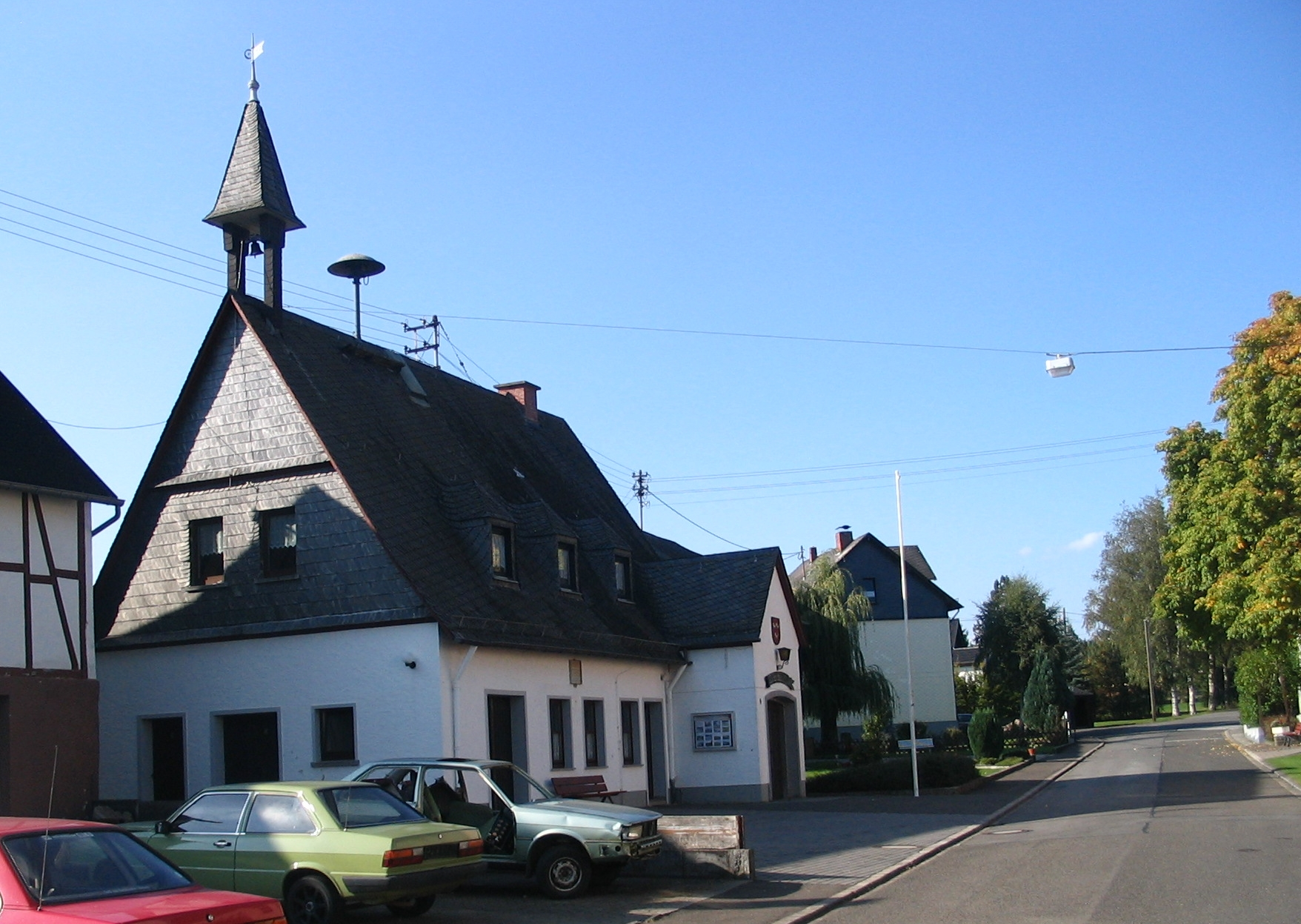
Birkenstraße: Saint Sebastian's Chapel

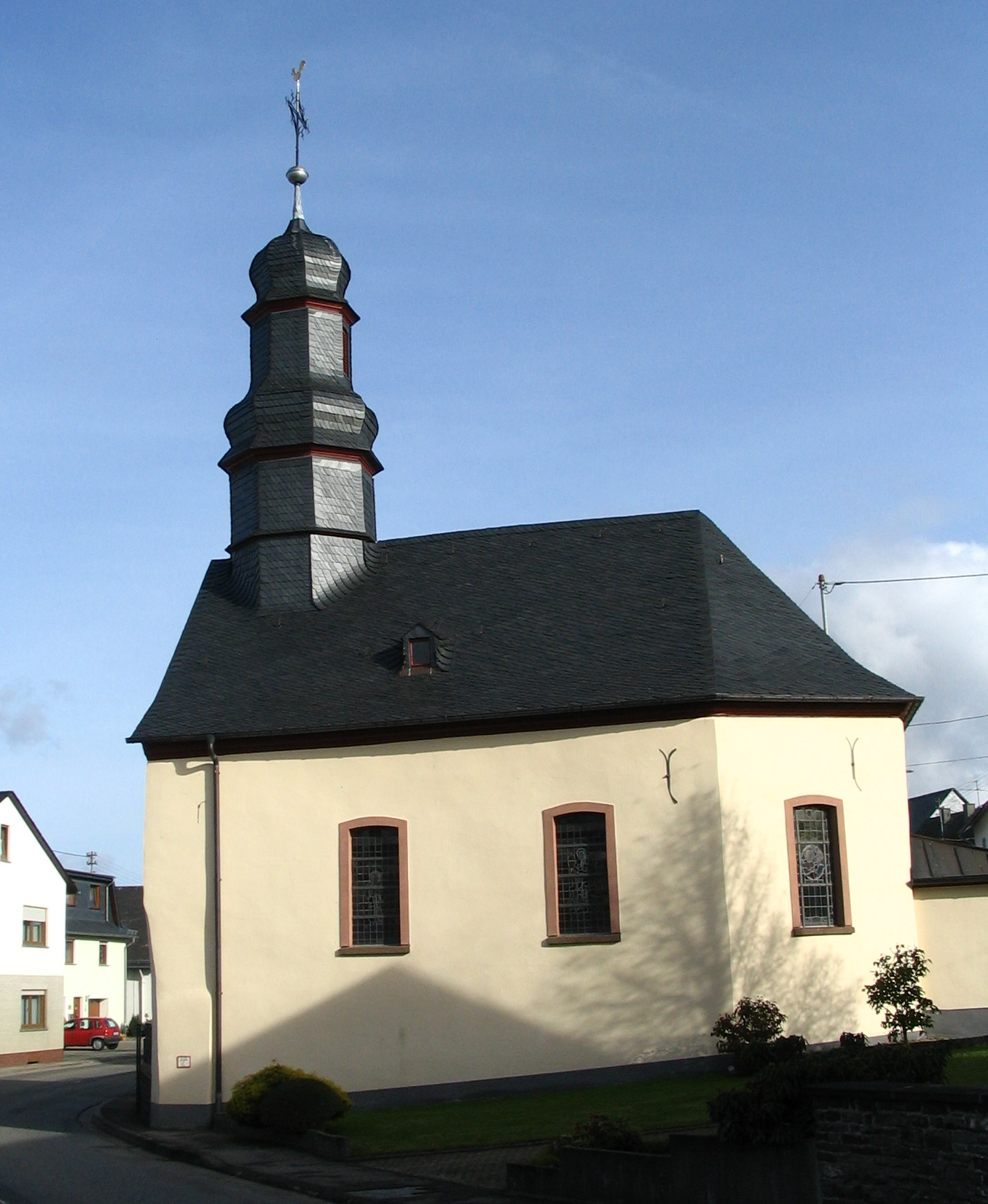
Ebschied
