= Michelbach, Rhein-Hunsrück =

Michelbach
- Municipality
- Location of Michelbach within Rhein-Hunsrück-Kreis district
- Interactive map of Michelbach
- Location within Germany Location within Rhineland-Palatinate
- Coordinates: 50°0′58″N 7°27′15″E
- Country: Germany
- State: Rhineland-Palatinate
- District: Rhein-Hunsrück-Kreis
- Municipal assoc.: Kastellaun

Government
  - Mayor (2019–24): Hans Jürgen Härter

Area
  - Total: 2.39 km^{2} (0.92 sq mi)
- Elevation: 430 m (1,410 ft)

Population (2025-12-31)
  - Total: 200
  - Density: 84/km^{2} (220/sq mi)
- Time zone: UTC+01:00 (CET)
  - Summer (DST): UTC+02:00 (CEST)
- Postal codes: 56288
- Dialling codes: 06761
- Vehicle registration: SIM

Michelbach (German: [ˈmɪçl̩ˌbax]) is an Ortsgemeinde – a municipality belonging to a Verbandsgemeinde, a kind of collective municipality – in the Rhein-Hunsrück-Kreis (district) in Rhineland-Palatinate, Germany. It belongs to the Verbandsgemeinde of Kastellaun, whose seat is in the like-named town.

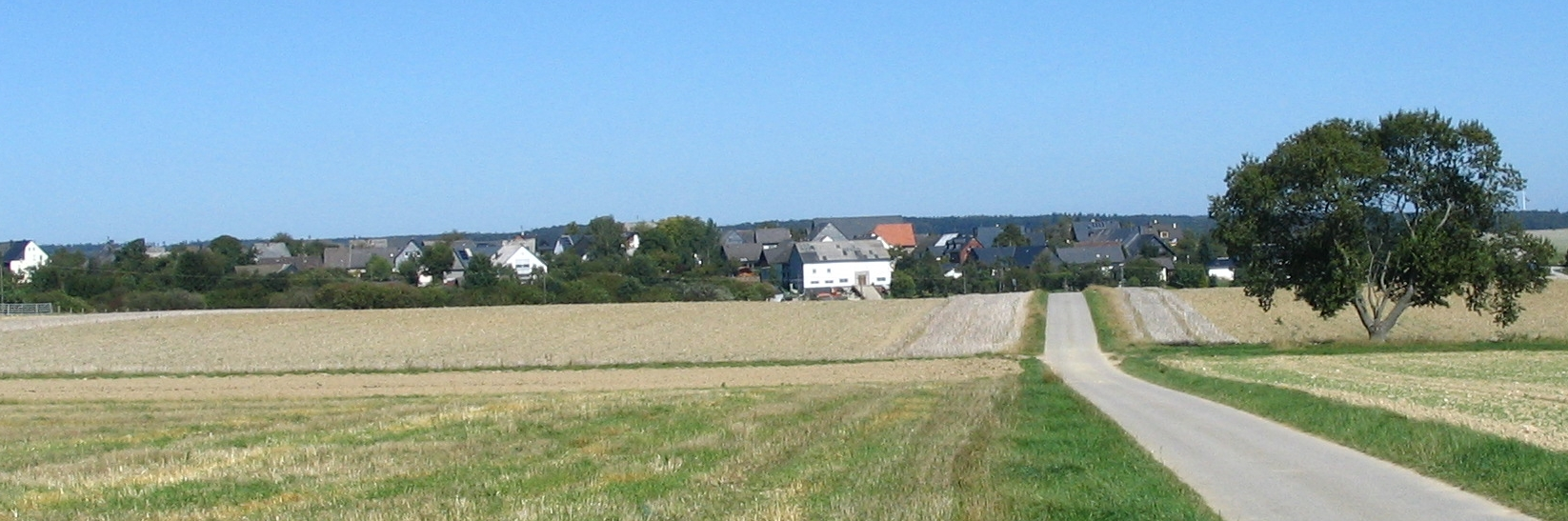
Michelbach seen from the south

== Geography ==
=== Location ===
The municipality lies in the Hunsrück on a hilltop among fields and meadows at an average elevation of 430 m above sea level between the Külzbach and Bieberbach valleys. The municipal area measures 2.39 km² of which 76% is given over to agricultural uses and 12% each is built up or wooded.

== History ==
Beginning in 1794, Michelbach lay under French rule. In 1814 it was assigned to the Kingdom of Prussia at the Congress of Vienna.

In 1850, the clergyman Bartels from Alterkülz founded a boys’ home in Michelbach, and in 1851 it was moved to the wetlands between Simmern and Nannhausen, where the first building of the Schmiedelanstalten (“Wetland Institutes”) was built. On 13 September 1851 it was dedicated with one housefather and twelve boys.

Since 1946, Michelbach has been part of the then newly founded state of Rhineland-Palatinate.

== Politics ==
=== Municipal council ===
The council is made up of 6 council members, who were elected by majority vote at the municipal election held on 7 June 2009, and the honorary mayor as chairman.

=== Mayor ===
Michelbach's mayor is Hans Jürgen Härter.
