= Spesenroth =

- Municipality
- Coat of arms

- Location of Spesenroth within Rhein-Hunsrück-Kreis district
- Interactive map of Spesenroth
- Location within Germany Location within Rhineland-Palatinate
- Coordinates: 50°3′1″N 7°27′38″E
- Country: Germany
- State: Rhineland-Palatinate
- District: Rhein-Hunsrück-Kreis
- Municipal assoc.: Kastellaun

Government
  - Mayor (2019–24): Volker Boos

Area
  - Total: 3.51 km^{2} (1.36 sq mi)
- Elevation: 460 m (1,510 ft)

Population (2025-12-31)
  - Total: 178
  - Density: 50.7/km^{2} (131/sq mi)
- Time zone: UTC+01:00 (CET)
  - Summer (DST): UTC+02:00 (CEST)
- Postal codes: 56288
- Dialling codes: 06762
- Vehicle registration: SIM
- Website: www.spesenroth.de

Spesenroth is Ortsgemeinde – a municipality belonging to a Verbandsgemeinde, a kind of collective municipality – in the Rhein-Hunsrück-Kreis (district) in Rhineland-Palatinate, Germany. It belongs to the Verbandsgemeinde of Kastellaun, whose seat is in the like-named town.

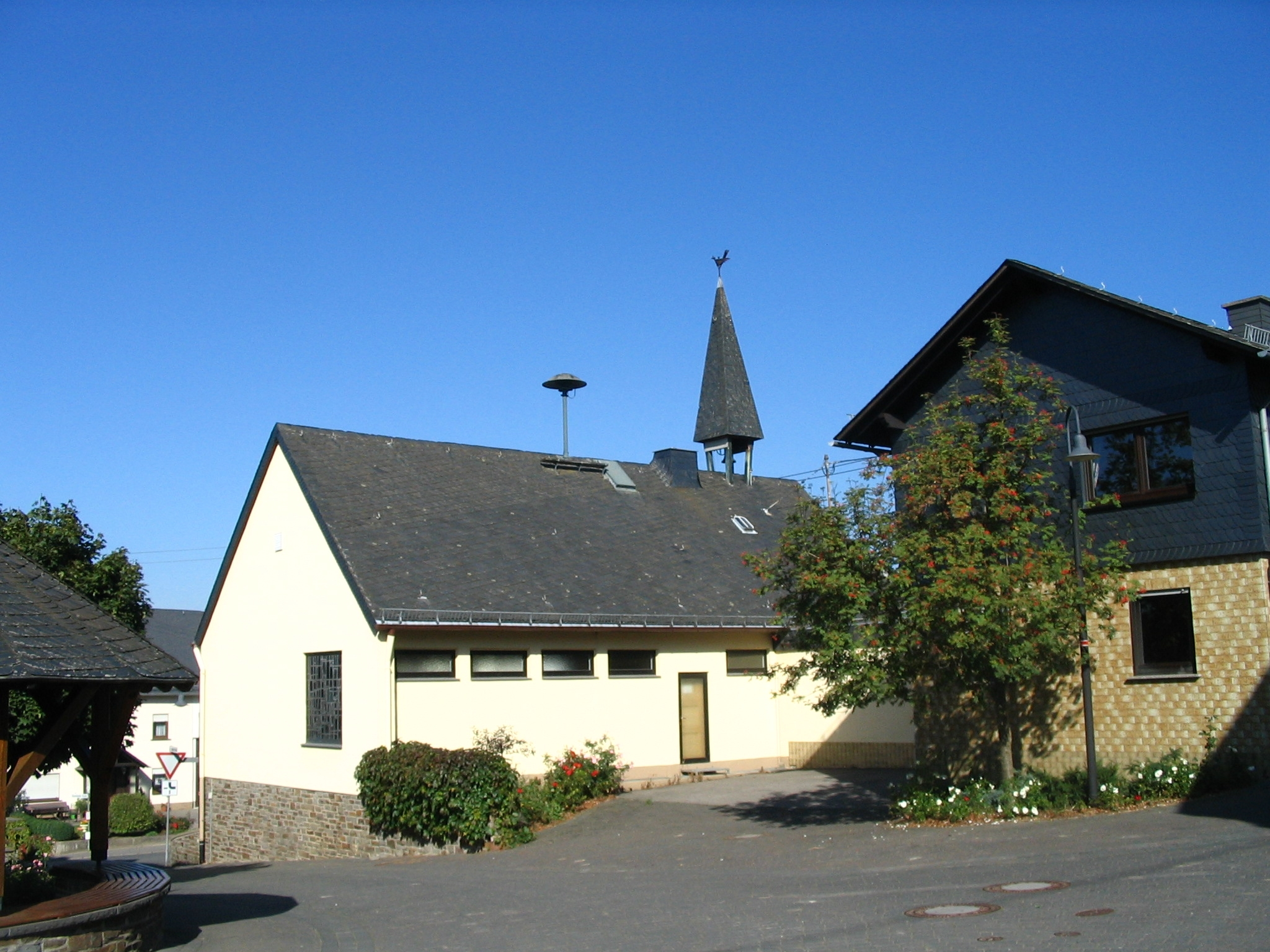
Spesenroth municipal centre

== Geography ==
=== Location ===
The municipality lies in the central Hunsrück. The village is perched on a hilltop between the Külzbach valley to the south and the town of Kastellaun 2 km to the northwest. The municipal area measures 3.51 km², of which 0.32 km² is mixed forest.

== History ==
In 1427, Spesenroth had its first documentary mention and belonged to the Amt of Kastellaun in the County of Sponheim. Beginning in 1794, Spesenroth lay under French rule. In 1815 it was assigned to the Kingdom of Prussia at the Congress of Vienna. Since 1946, it has been part of the then newly founded state of Rhineland-Palatinate.

== Politics ==
=== Municipal council ===
The council is made up of 6 council members, who were elected by majority vote at the municipal election held on 7 June 2009, and the honorary mayor as chairman.

=== Mayor ===
Spesenroth's mayor is Volker Boos, and his deputies are Adrian Leuze and Karl-Otto Vollrath.

=== Coat of arms ===
The German blazon reads: Der Schild in Gold, geteilt durch einen rotsilbernen doppelreihig geschachteten Schräglinksbalken, oben ein linksgewendeter blauer Kuckuck, unten ein dreizweigiges grünes Wacholderreis mit blauen Beeren.

The municipality's arms might in English heraldic language be described thus: Or a bend sinister countercompony gules and argent between a cuckoo sinister azure and a juniper twig slipped and fructed all proper.

The bend sinister (slanted stripe) is a reference to the village's former allegiance to the “Hinder” County of Sponheim and the Amt of Kastellaun. The cuckoo is a canting charge for the nickname still customarily used for the villagers (Kuckuck in German). The juniper twig refers to the “juniper beating”, part of the fieldfare hunt on the Spesenroth Heath. This heath was for centuries a bone of contention among the municipalities of Kastellaun, Alterkülz and Spesenroth. Today, the greater part of the heath is within Spesenroth's limits.
