= Hasselbach, Rhein-Hunsrück =

Hasselbach
- Municipality
- Coat of arms

- Location of Hasselbach within Rhein-Hunsrück-Kreis district
- Interactive map of Hasselbach
- Location within Germany Location within Rhineland-Palatinate
- Coordinates: 50°02′23″N 7°27′02″E
- Country: Germany
- State: Rhineland-Palatinate
- District: Rhein-Hunsrück-Kreis
- Municipal assoc.: Kastellaun

Government
  - Mayor (2019–24): Sascha Eisinger

Area
  - Total: 4.79 km^{2} (1.85 sq mi)
- Elevation: 410 m (1,350 ft)

Population (2025-12-31)
  - Total: 226
  - Density: 47.2/km^{2} (122/sq mi)
- Time zone: UTC+01:00 (CET)
  - Summer (DST): UTC+02:00 (CEST)
- Postal codes: 56288
- Dialling codes: 06762
- Vehicle registration: SIM

Hasselbach (German pronunciation: [ˈhasl̩bax]) is an Ortsgemeinde – a municipality belonging to a Verbandsgemeinde, a kind of collective municipality – in the Rhein-Hunsrück-Kreis (district) in Rhineland-Palatinate, Germany. It belongs to the Verbandsgemeinde of Kastellaun, whose seat is in the like-named town.

== Geography ==
=== Location ===
The municipality lies in the Hunsrück, in a dale between the Gimbach and, coming from Hundheim, the Hundheimer Bach. These two brooks flow together within Alterkülz’s municipal limits and the resulting stream is thereafter known as the Külzbach. The greater part of the outlying countryside within Hasselbach’s municipal limits is sloped.

== History ==
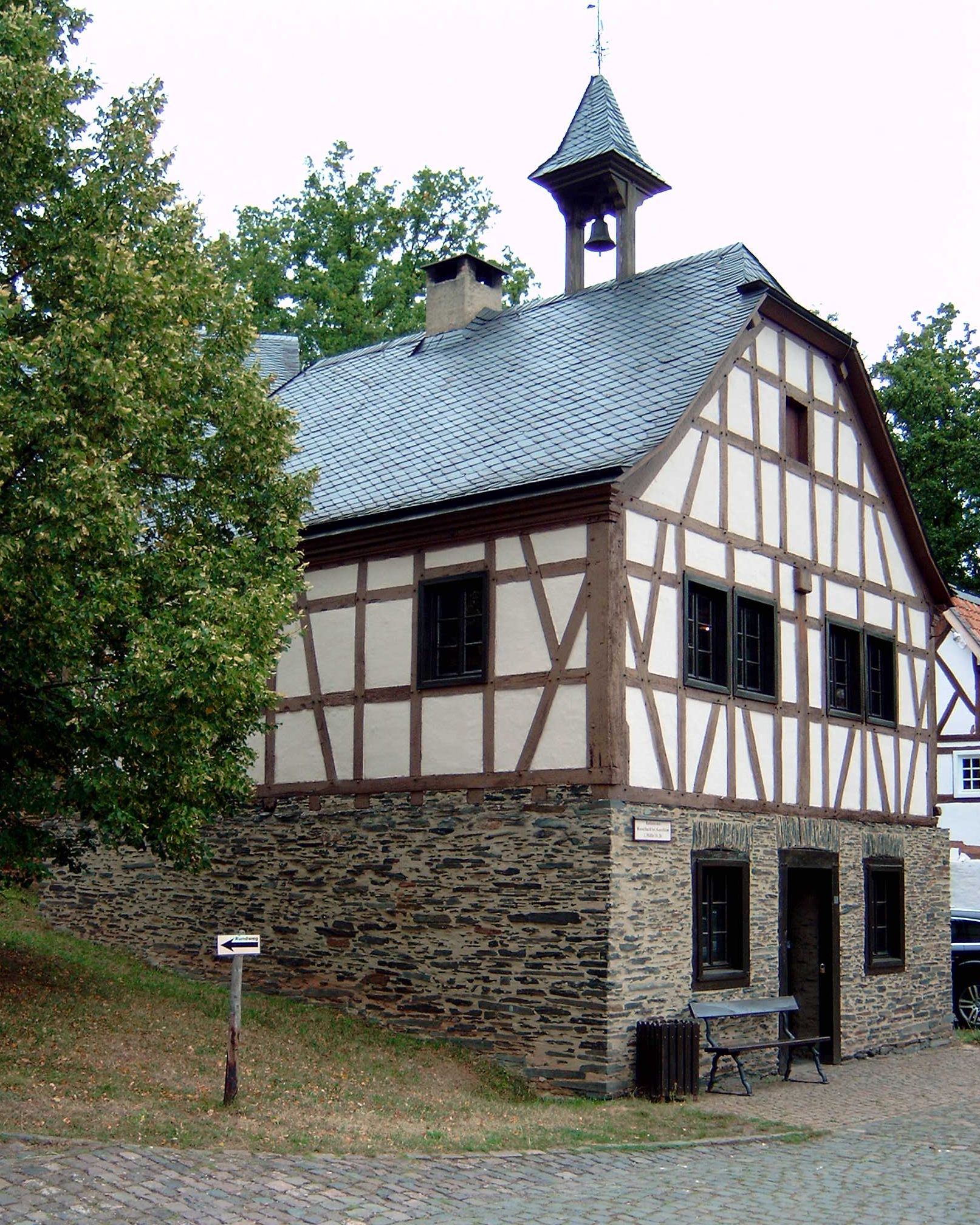
Former town hall

In 1310, Hasselbach had its first documentary mention in the Sponheimisches Gefälleregister, a taxation register kept by the County of Sponheim.

Beginning in 1794, Hasselbach lay under French rule. In 1815 it was assigned to the Kingdom of Prussia at the Congress of Vienna. Since 1946, it has been part of the then newly founded state of Rhineland-Palatinate.

Hasselbach became well known in the years from 1983 to 1989 for the peace movement’s Easter Marches (Ostermärsche), inspired by the Aldermaston Marches in the United Kingdom, which were always held at Easter. Marchers were protesting the stationing of cruise missiles proposed within the framework of the NATO Double-Track Decision for the nearby Pydna Missile Base.

Hasselbach’s former town hall, built in 1750, was dismantled in 1977 when it became unusable. It was then reassembled in 1978 and 1979 at the Rheinland-Pfälzisches Freilichtmuseum Bad Sobernheim (“Rhineland-Palatinate Open-Air Museum at Bad Sobernheim”). The upper floor houses a small room that was once the council chamber, and the lower floor has been restored to its original use – a bakehouse. In earlier days, when the town hall was still in Hasselbach, a system was established laying out how the order of the bakehouse users was to be determined. Lots were also drawn to determine who had to fire the ovens up and who had to clean the bakehouse up.

In 1954, a lot was acquired for the new municipal administration building, but only in 1964 could work on it begin. On 4 May 1968, the new building was dedicated. Sweeping renovations and conversions were undertaken in 1987 and 1988.

== Politics ==
=== Municipal council ===
The council is made up of 6 council members, who were elected by majority vote at the municipal election held on 7 June 2009, and the honorary mayor as chairman.

=== Mayor ===
Hasselbach's mayor is Sascha Eisinger.

=== Coat of arms ===
The German blazon reads: Schild gespalten durch blaue Wellenleiste, vorn rot-silber geschachtet, hinten grüner Haselnusszweig in Gold.

The municipality's arms might in English heraldic language be described thus: An endorse wavy azure between chequy of twenty-one argent and gules and Or a hazel twig bendwise slipped, leafed of three and fructed of two, all proper.

Earlier forms of the placename Hasselbach, such as Hasilbach and Haselbach, derived from Hasala, an old word for “hazel shrub” (“hazel” is Hasel in Modern High German). The charge on the sinister (armsbearer's left, viewer's right) side, a hazel twig with leaves and nuts, is thus canting. The silver and red “chequy” pattern on the dexter (armsbearer's right, viewer's left) side refers to Hasselbach's former allegiance to the County of Sponheim, and more specifically to its former inclusion in that county's Amt of Kastellaun. Between the two sides is a wavy “endorse” (a much slimmer version of a pale) standing for a brook, or Bach in German, thus referring to the last syllable in the placename Hasselbach.

The arms have been borne since 27 October 2009.

== Culture and sightseeing ==
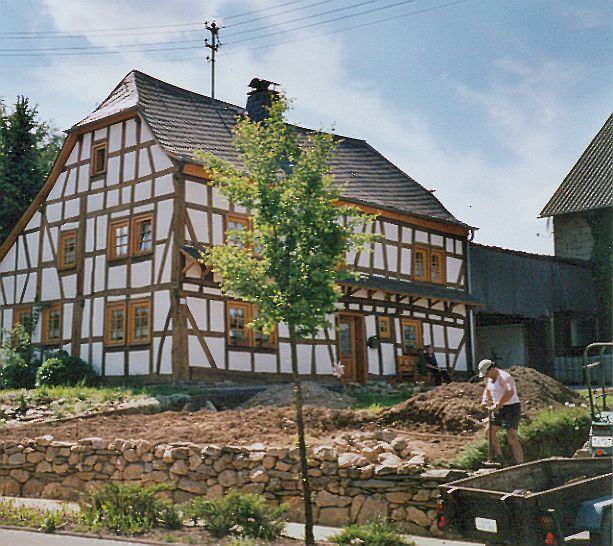
Timber-frame house, Dorfstraße 11

=== Buildings ===
The following are listed buildings or sites in Rhineland-Palatinate’s Directory of Cultural Monuments:

- Dorfstraße 11 – timber-frame building house, half-hipped roof, early 19th century
- Dorfstraße 16 – timber-frame house, partly solid and slated, half-hipped roof, earlier half of the 19th century; timber-frame stable, partly brick, about 1900
- At Dorfstraße 33 – Late Classicist door with skylight, mid 18th century

=== Sport and leisure ===
Ever since 1996, a tent city has arisen around Hasselbach each year in August to host those attending the open-air electronic music festival Nature One.

On the Gartenroute Hunsrück-Mittelrhein, a vast garden belonging to Hasselbach’s old schoolhouse can be visited. The schoolhouse itself today houses a museum displaying toys from the last 150 years.

Just beyond the village’s outskirts runs the "Schinderhannes Cycle Path".
