= Mastershausen =

- Municipality
- Coat of arms

- Location of Mastershausen within Rhein-Hunsrück-Kreis district
- Interactive map of Mastershausen
- Location within Germany Location within Rhineland-Palatinate
- Coordinates: 50°3′58″N 7°21′28″E
- Country: Germany
- State: Rhineland-Palatinate
- District: Rhein-Hunsrück-Kreis
- Municipal assoc.: Kastellaun

Government
  - Mayor (2019–24): Anton Christ

Area
  - Total: 11.83 km^{2} (4.57 sq mi)
- Elevation: 379 m (1,243 ft)

Population (2025-12-31)
  - Total: 996
  - Density: 84.2/km^{2} (218/sq mi)
- Time zone: UTC+01:00 (CET)
  - Summer (DST): UTC+02:00 (CEST)
- Postal codes: 56869
- Dialling codes: 06545
- Vehicle registration: SIM
- Website: www.mastershausen.de

Mastershausen is an Ortsgemeinde – a municipality belonging to a Verbandsgemeinde, a kind of collective municipality – in the Rhein-Hunsrück-Kreis (district) in Rhineland-Palatinate, Germany. It belongs to the Verbandsgemeinde of Kastellaun, whose seat is in the like-named town.

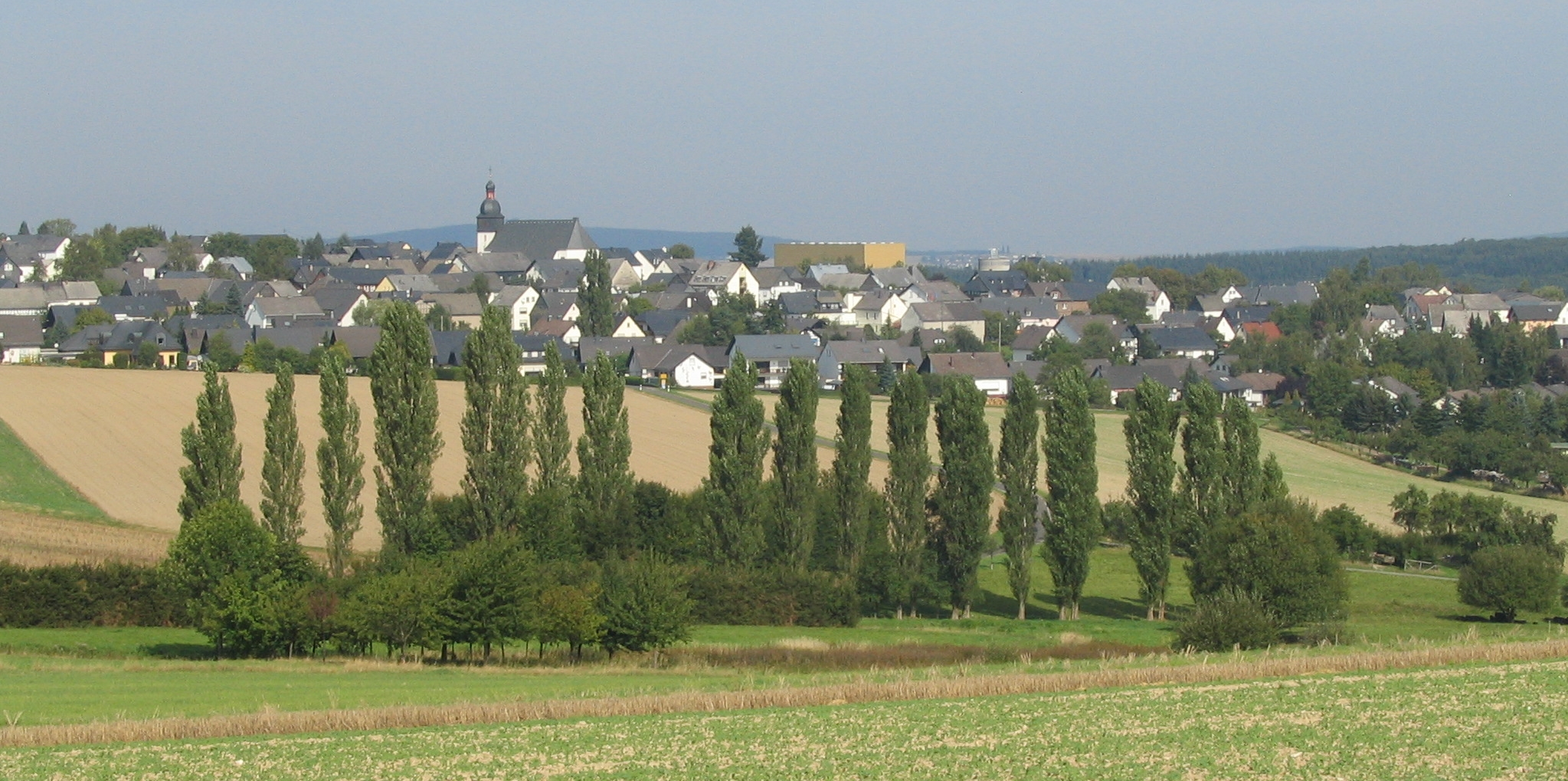
Mastershausen seen from the south

== Geography ==
=== Location ===
The municipality lies in the Hunsrück near Frankfurt-Hahn Airport, roughly 5 km west of Kastellaun. Through the village runs the road from Buch past the ruin of Castle Balduinseck to Blankenrath.

== History ==
Finds of coins and vessels bear witness to Celtic settlement on the Burgkopf, a nearby mountain spur, as do remnants of a Roman temple and two grave complexes that have been unearthed. In 1056, Mastershausen had its first documentary mention as Malestreshusen; the church was first mentioned in 1220. Beginning in 1316, Mastershausen, together with 15 neighbouring places, belonged to the Amt of Balduinseck in the Electorate of Trier. In 1325, Castle Balduinseck (Burg Balduinseck) was built as the Amt seat. Its ruin is still among the municipality’s points of interest. Some timber-frame buildings, too, have been preserved. Beginning in 1794, Mastershausen lay under French rule. In 1814 it was assigned to the Kingdom of Prussia at the Congress of Vienna. Since 1946, it has been part of the then newly founded state of Rhineland-Palatinate. Until 1970, the municipality belonged to the Amt of Blankenrath, but under the Eighth Verwaltungsvereinfachungsgesetz (“Administration Simplification Law”) of 18 July 1970, with effect from 7 November 1970, the municipality was grouped into the Rhein-Hunsrück-Kreis, and has ever since belonged to the Verbandsgemeinde of Kastellaun. The town of Kastellaun is also where the municipal administration is located.

== Politics ==
=== Municipal council ===
The council is made up of 16 council members, who were elected by majority vote at the municipal election held on 7 June 2009, and the honorary mayor as chairman.

=== Mayor ===
Mastershausen’s mayor is Anton Christ.

=== Coat of arms ===
The municipality’s arms might be described thus: Tierced in mantle reversed, dexter argent a cross gules and sinister argent a cross sable, between which sable a crown Or.

The red cross is the arms formerly borne by the Electorate of Trier, to which Mastershausen belonged for more than 400 years. The black cross is the arms borne by the Cologne Cathedral Foundation, which until 1794 held collation rights (that is, the right to nominate candidates to fill vacant ecclesiastical posts) in Mastershausen. The golden crown on the black field recalls Queen Richeza of Poland, who donated holdings at Malestreshusen to the Brauweiler Monastery.

== Culture and sightseeing ==
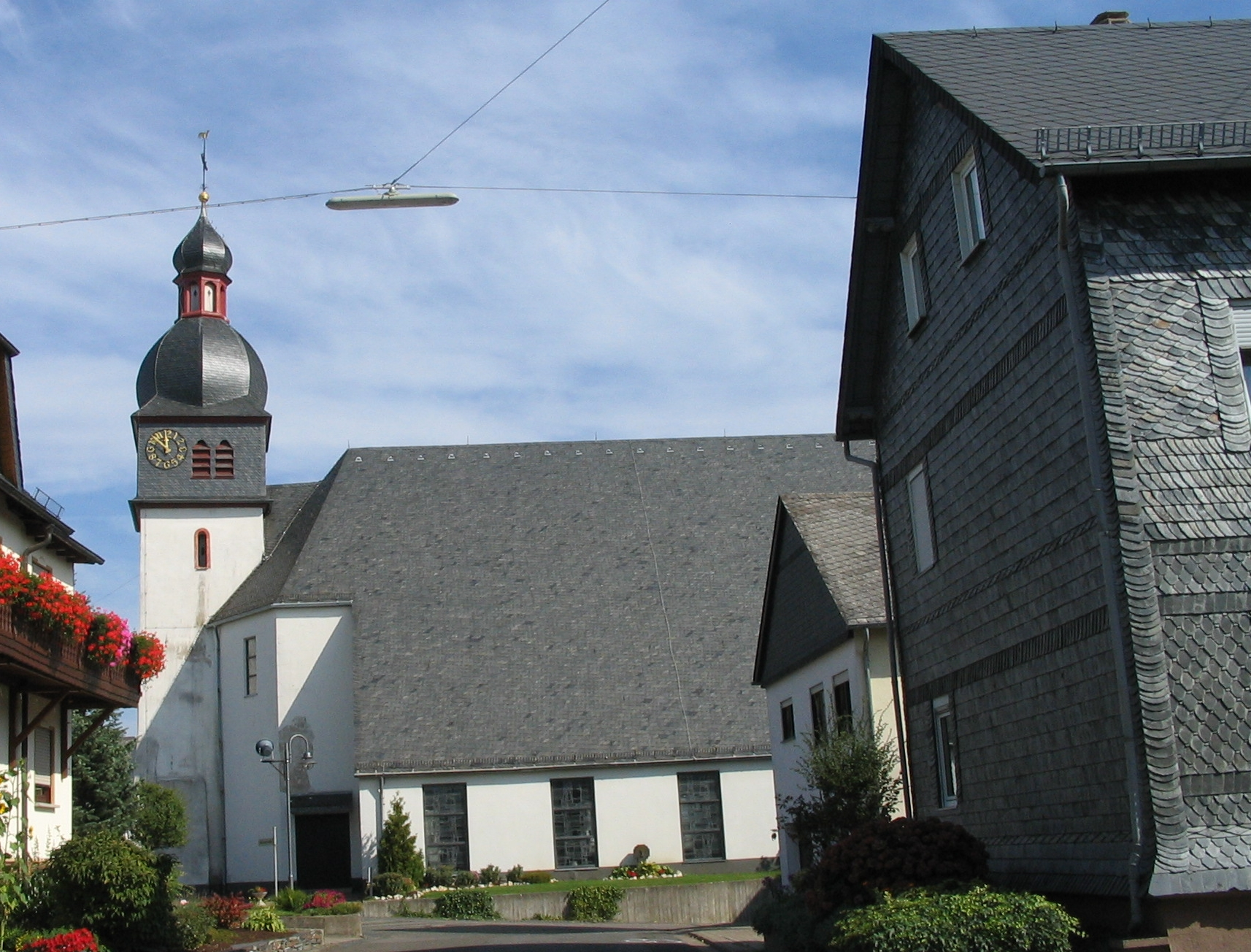
Kirchstraße 5: Saint Lucy’s Catholic Parish Church

=== Buildings ===
The following are listed buildings or sites in Rhineland-Palatinate’s Directory of Cultural Monuments:

- Saint Lucy’s Catholic Parish Church (Pfarrkirche St. Lucia), Kirchstraße 5 – Romanesque (?) west tower, tower cupola, 1928; new building, 1965; outside, a basalt grave cross, marked 1801
- Friedhof – cast-iron grave cross, Rheinböllen Ironworks, latter half of the 19th century
- At Johann-Steffen-Straße 23 – Madonna sculpture under wooden baldachin, 19th century
- Johann-Steffen-Straße 28 – L-shaped estate, whole complex of buildings; timber-frame house, partly solid or slated, half-hipped roof, bakehouse, 18th century, barn, stable
- At Johann-Steffen-Straße 29 – Joseph sculpture under wooden baldachin, 19th century
- Kirchstraße 8 – former rectory; solid building, marked 1903, essentially possibly from the latter half of the 19th century, timber-frame barn, partly solid; whole complex of buildings
- Near Kirchstraße 9 – former school; plastered timber-frame house, 19th century; basalt grave cross, marked 1748
- Zum Mautzbach 1 – Quereinhaus (a combination residential and commercial house divided for these two purposes down the middle, perpendicularly to the street), partly slated, marked 1902
- Boundary stones, on Landesstraße (State Road) 203 on the village’s outskirts – three boundary stones, two marked 1776
- Kaspersmühle (mill), north of the village – one-floor timber-frame building, waterwheel, 19th century
- Wayside cross, east of the village – cast-iron grave cross
