= Roth, Rhein-Hunsrück =

Roth
- Municipality
- Coat of arms

- Location of Roth within Rhein-Hunsrück-Kreis district
- Interactive map of Roth
- Location within Germany Location within Rhineland-Palatinate
- Coordinates: 50°5′17″N 7°27′27″E
- Country: Germany
- State: Rhineland-Palatinate
- District: Rhein-Hunsrück-Kreis
- Municipal assoc.: Kastellaun

Government
  - Mayor (2019–24): Thomas Walber

Area
  - Total: 3.87 km^{2} (1.49 sq mi)
- Elevation: 390 m (1,280 ft)

Population (2025-12-31)
  - Total: 247
  - Density: 63.8/km^{2} (165/sq mi)
- Time zone: UTC+01:00 (CET)
  - Summer (DST): UTC+02:00 (CEST)
- Postal codes: 56288
- Dialling codes: 06762
- Vehicle registration: SIM
- Website: www.roth-hunsrueck.de

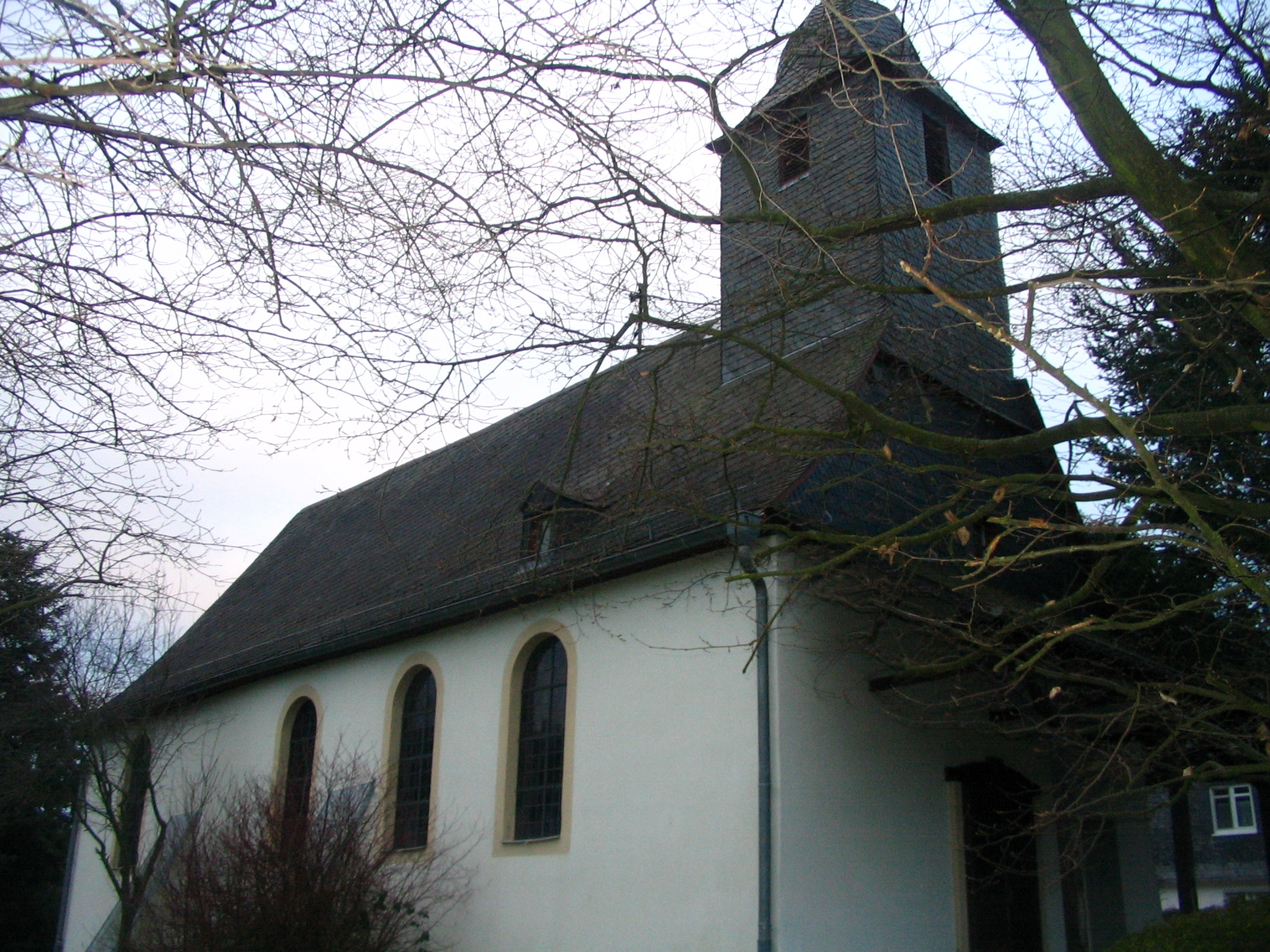
Chapel

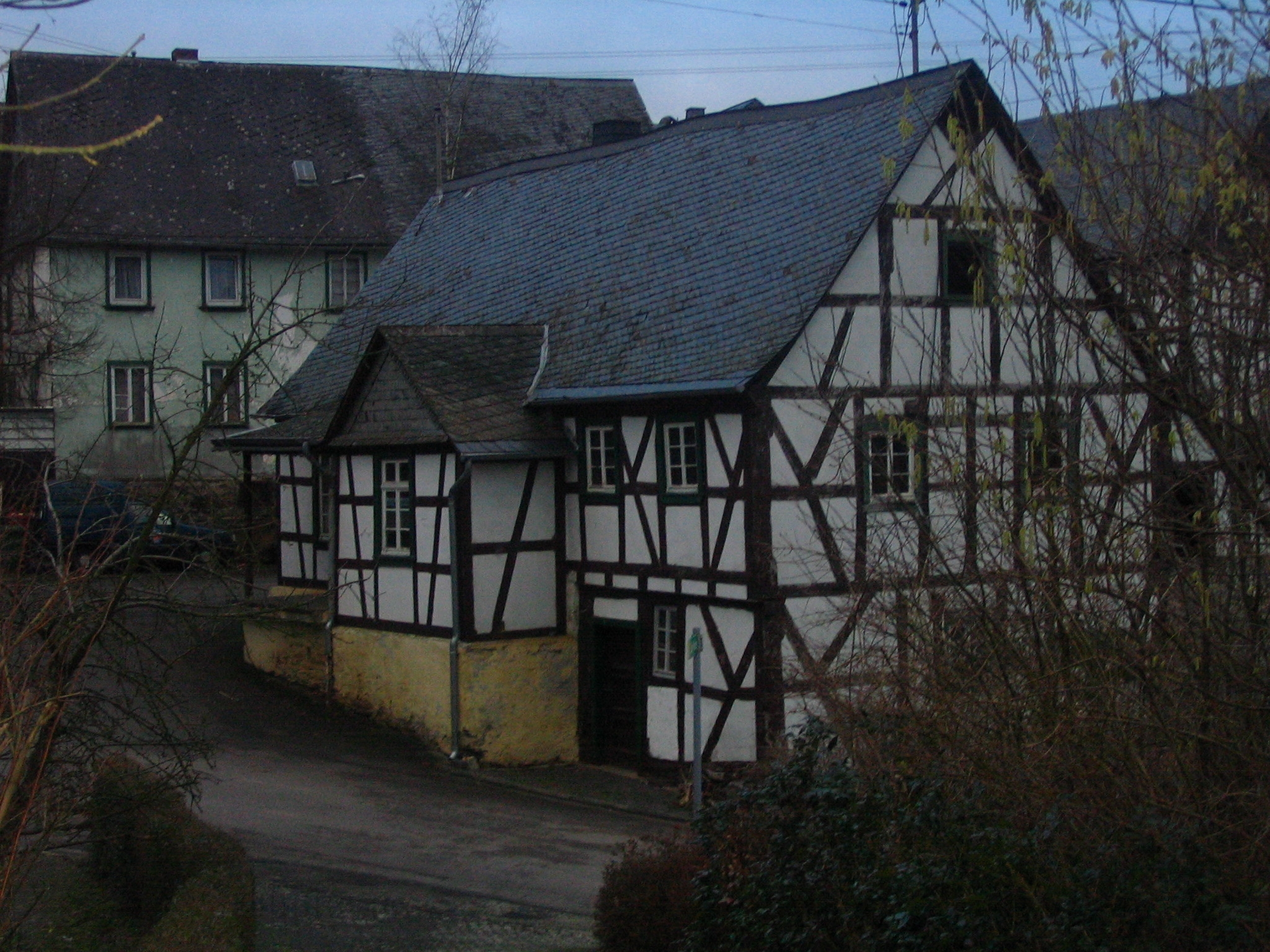
Former Raiffeisen store

Roth (German pronunciation: [ʁoːt]) is an Ortsgemeinde – a municipality belonging to a Verbandsgemeinde', a kind of collective municipality – in the Rhein-Hunsrück-Kreis (district) in Rhineland-Palatinate, Germany. It belongs to the Verbandsgemeinde of Kastellaun, whose seat is in the like-named town.

== Geography ==
=== Location ===
The municipality lies in the Hunsrück roughly 2 km northeast of Kastellaun and 14 km southeast of the Moselle at Treis-Karden.

=== Neighbouring municipalities ===
Clockwise from the north, these are Beltheim, Gödenroth, Kastellaun and Uhler.

== History ==
In the Middle Ages, Roth belonged to the "Further" County of Sponheim. In 1417, the village passed along with the Amt of Kastellaun to the "Hinder" County of Sponheim. Beginning in 1794, Roth lay under French rule. In 1815 it was assigned to the Kingdom of Prussia at the Congress of Vienna. Since 1946, it has been part of the then newly founded state of Rhineland-Palatinate.

== Politics ==
=== Municipal council ===
The council is made up of 6 council members, who were elected by majority vote at the municipal election held on 7 June 2009, and the honorary mayor as chairman.

=== Mayor ===
Roth's mayor is Thomas Walber.

=== Coat of arms ===
The German blazon reads: Gespalten durch eine eingeschweifte Spitze, darin ein silberner Pflug, vorn rot-silber geschacht, hinten in silber eine blaue heraldische Lilie.

The municipality's arms might in English heraldic language be described thus: Tierced in mantle, dexter chequy gules and argent, sinister argent a fleur-de-lis azure, and in base vert a plough of the second.

The charge on the sinister (armsbearer's left, viewer's right) side, the blue fleur-de-lis on the silver field, refers to Roth's first documentary mention in an 1100 directory of holdings from the Karden Foundation. The red and silver "chequy" pattern on the dexter (armsbearer's right, viewer's left) side is a reference to the village's former allegiance to the "Hinder" County of Sponheim. The silver plough on the green field refers not only to the great importance and tradition of agriculture in the municipality, but also to the origin of the village's name ("Roth" comes from the same root as the German verb roden, meaning "clear", with reference to clearing land of trees for farming and settling).

The arms were designed by E. König and have been borne since 15 July 2002.

== Culture and sightseeing ==
=== Buildings ===
The following are listed buildings or sites in Rhineland-Palatinate’s Directory of Cultural Monuments:

- Saint Leonard’s Catholic Church (Kirche St. Leonhard), Im Dorf 36 – aisleless church, 1661/1662, extension 18th century; outside tomb slab, 1621; whole complex of buildings with graveyard
- Hauptstraße 3 – former school; plastered building, partly timber-frame, about 1910
- Im Dorf 21 – timber-frame Quereinhaus (a combination residential and commercial house divided for these two purposes down the middle, perpendicularly to the street), earlier half of the 19th century
- Im Dorf 27 – estate complex; timber-frame house, partly solid or slated, early 19th century, timber-frame barn 19th century
- Im Dorf 46 – bakehouse, one-floor timber-frame building, 19th century
- Kastellauner Weg 1 – L-shaped estate; timber-frame house, partly slated, hipped mansard roof, early 19th century, timber-frame barn
- Bridge, on the path to the Günnewig Mühle (mill) – single-arch quarrystone bridge

== Economy and infrastructure ==
=== Transport ===
Roth lies 800 m from the Hunsrückhöhenstraße ("Hunsrück Heights Road", Bundesstraße 327, a scenic road across the Hunsrück built originally as a military road on Hermann Göring’s orders).
