= Korweiler =

- Municipality
- Coat of arms

- Location of Korweiler within Rhein-Hunsrück-Kreis district
- Interactive map of Korweiler
- Location within Germany Location within Rhineland-Palatinate
- Coordinates: 50°6′30″N 7°24′59″E
- Country: Germany
- State: Rhineland-Palatinate
- District: Rhein-Hunsrück-Kreis
- Municipal assoc.: Kastellaun

Government
  - Mayor (2019–24): Georg Wagner

Area
  - Total: 2.43 km^{2} (0.94 sq mi)
- Elevation: 340 m (1,120 ft)

Population (2025-12-31)
  - Total: 82
  - Density: 34/km^{2} (87/sq mi)
- Time zone: UTC+01:00 (CET)
  - Summer (DST): UTC+02:00 (CEST)
- Postal codes: 56288
- Dialling codes: 06762
- Vehicle registration: SIM

Korweiler is an Ortsgemeinde – a municipality belonging to a Verbandsgemeinde, a kind of collective municipality – in the Rhein-Hunsrück-Kreis (district) in Rhineland-Palatinate, Germany. It belongs to the Verbandsgemeinde of Kastellaun, whose seat is in the like-named town.

== Geography ==
=== Location ===
The municipality lies in the northern Hunsrück on a ridge east of the Dünnbach valley.

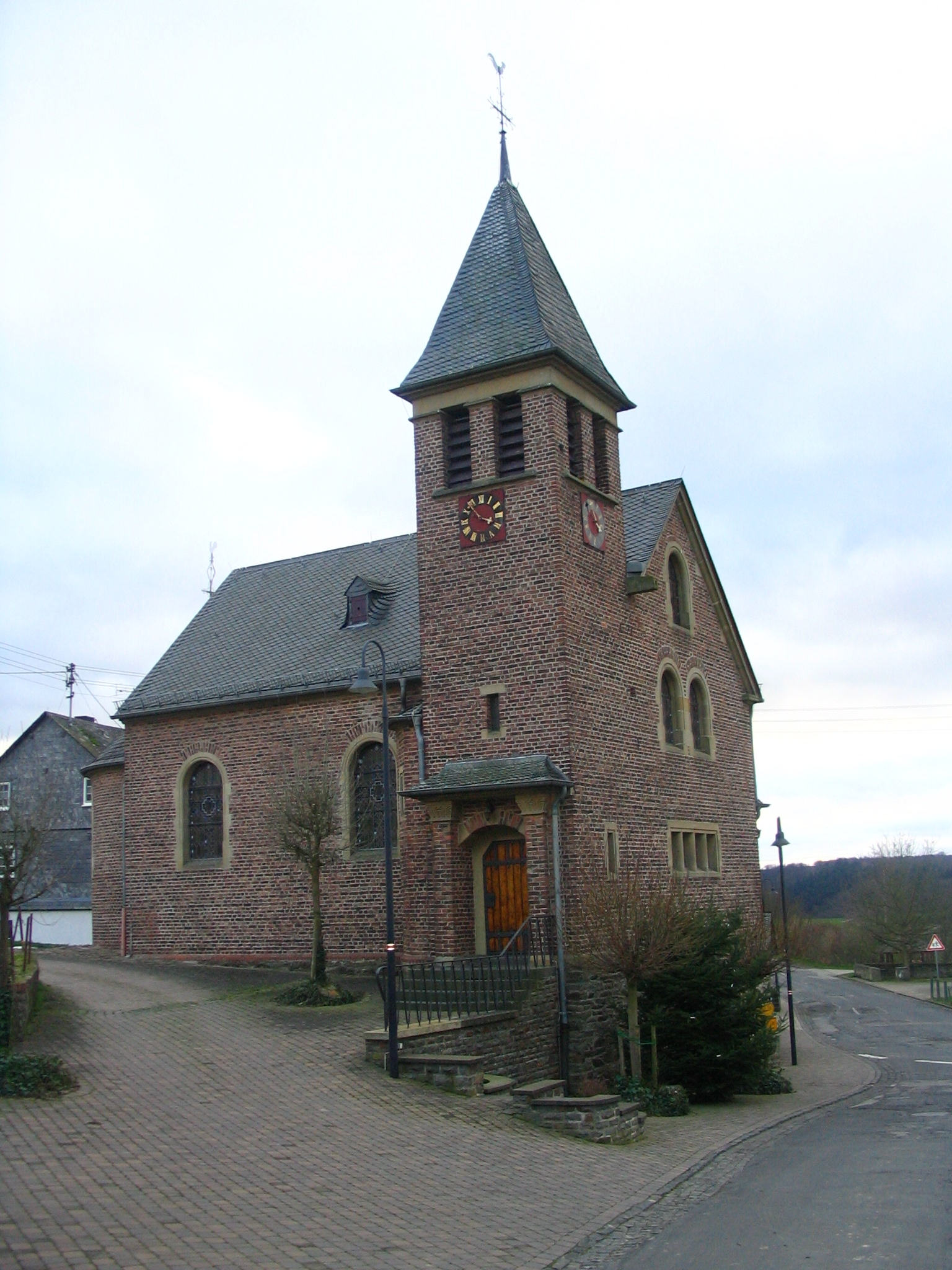
Saint Bartholomew’s Chapel

Korweiler is a typical bunched village, which has gathered itself around its Catholic church. Built in 1907 with a single nave, the Bartholomäuskapelle (Saint Bartholomew’s Chapel) is consecrated to Bartholomew the Apostle.

== History ==
The oldest evidence of settlers in the area comes from early La Tène times. In 1939 and 1940, while cross-country paths were being built, Iron Age settlement groups were unearthed. Going by the ceramics that were found then, the settlements are about 2,400 years old and belong to the later Hunsrück-Eifel Culture. No further investigations were undertaken at the time – it was, after all, during the Second World War – but it is quite likely that Iron Age houses once stood here.

The village that stands now had its first documentary mention in 1307 as Corwilre. According to the document, Sibodo von Schmidtberg donated his holdings in Corwilre to the Kumbd Convent, to which an estate, serfs and income in the village belonged in the centuries that followed and on into early modern times.

While Korweiler might have belonged beginning in the Late Middle Ages or early modern times to the Lordship of Waldeck and Waldeck Castle, the village held a special place within the Lordship owing to the Kumbd properties and rights. Nevertheless, the family Boos zu Waldeck long held “patronage money” (German: Schirmgeld), that is to say, the Kumbd Convent’s rights and income. The Lordship of Waldeck was by the 16th century independent of the Empire and comprised not only the castle lands but also the villages of Dorweiler, Mannebach and Korweiler as well as the forsaken village of Hausen near Beltheim. Even though the village belonged to the Lordship of Waldeck, all Korweiler’s inhabitants were said to be Willibrordskinder (“Willibrord’s children”), meaning that originally, they belonged to a fief of Saint Willibrord’s Abbey in Echternach. Given this tangle of allegiances and ownership rights, there were time and again disagreements with the Knights of Waldeck, leading to conflicts and compromises all the way to the Reichskammergericht.

In 1711, most of the village, along with the Kumbd hereditary estate, burnt down and had to be built over again. This is why Korweiler has so few buildings that date any further back than the 18th century.

In 1793, the region was occupied by French Revolutionary troops and assigned to the Department of Rhin-et-Moselle, making it French until the Congress of Vienna in 1815. The Congress rearranged Europe’s post-Napoleonic political map, putting Korweiler in the Kingdom of Prussia, and locally in the Rhine Province. Since 1946, it has been part of the then newly founded state of Rhineland-Palatinate.

== Politics ==
=== Municipal council ===
The council is made up of 6 council members, who were elected by majority vote at the municipal election held on 7 June 2009, and the honorary mayor as chairman.

=== Mayor ===
Korweiler’s mayor is Georg Wagner.

=== Coat of arms ===
The municipality’s arms might be described thus: Gules an abbot’s staff Or, the shaft sable, bendwise sinister surmounted by three arming buckles bottony conjoined in bend sans tongues argent.

== Culture and sightseeing ==
=== Buildings ===
The following are listed buildings or sites in Rhineland-Palatinate’s Directory of Cultural Monuments:

- Saint Bartholomew’s Catholic Church (Kirche St. Bartholomäus or Bartholomäuskapelle), Dorfstraße 30 – Baroque Revival aisleless church, 1907; before the church a sandstone cross, marked 1914
- Dorfstraße 1 – timber-frame Quereinhaus (a combination residential and commercial house divided for these two purposes down the middle, perpendicularly to the street), partly solid, 19th century
- Dorfstraße 10 – timber-frame Quereinhaus, partly solid or slated, 19th century; whole complex of buildings
- Dorfstraße 11 – timber-frame Quereinhaus, partly solid, possibly from the 18th century; whole complex of buildings with barn

=== Dialect ===
The region’s Moselle Franconian dialect is still spoken by a majority of the inhabitants, although the number of those who still actively use the dialect is shrinking.

=== Regular events ===
Once each year, the municipality comes together at the Gemeindetag (“Municipal Day”) at the former school, a typical brick building, to eat, drink and chat.
