= Who's Who in British History =

Who's Who in British History is a multi-volume work composed of:

- Who's Who in Roman Britain and Anglo-Saxon England, Richard Fletcher. Shepheard-Walwyn, London, 2002 ISBN 0-85683-114-X
- Who's Who in Early Medieval England 1066-1272, Christopher Tyerman. Shepheard-Walwyn, London, 1996 ISBN 0-85683-091-7
- Who's Who in Late Medieval England 1272-1485, M A Hicks. Shepheard-Walwyn, London, 1991 ISBN 0-85683-092-5
- Who's Who in Tudor England 1485-1603, C.R.N. Routh. Stackpole Books, Mechanicsburg, PA. 2001 ISBN 0-8117-1639-2
- Who's Who in Stuart Britain 1603-1714, C P Hill. Shepheard-Walwyn, London, 2001. ISBN 978-0-85683-110-2
- Who's Who in Early Hanoverian Britain 1714-1789, G R R Treasure. Shepheard-Walwyn, London, 1991. ISBN 978-0-85683-131-7
- Who's Who in Late Hanoverian Britain 1789-1837, G R R Treasure. Shepheard-Walwyn, London, 2002. ISBN 978-0-85683-137-9
- Who's Who in Victorian Britain, Roger Ellis. Shepheard-Walwyn, London, 2001. ISBN 978-0-85683-138-6
