= Hollnich =

- Municipality
- Coat of arms

- Location of Hollnich within Rhein-Hunsrück-Kreis district
- Interactive map of Hollnich
- Location within Germany Location within Rhineland-Palatinate
- Coordinates: 50°4′27″N 7°29′17″E
- Country: Germany
- State: Rhineland-Palatinate
- District: Rhein-Hunsrück-Kreis
- Municipal assoc.: Kastellaun

Government
  - Mayor (2019–24): Rainer Scherer

Area
  - Total: 2.27 km^{2} (0.88 sq mi)
- Elevation: 450 m (1,480 ft)

Population (2025-12-31)
  - Total: 293
  - Density: 129/km^{2} (334/sq mi)
- Time zone: UTC+01:00 (CET)
  - Summer (DST): UTC+02:00 (CEST)
- Postal codes: 56288
- Dialling codes: 06762
- Vehicle registration: SIM

Hollnich (German pronunciation: [ˈhɔlnɪç]) near Kastellaun is an Ortsgemeinde – a municipality belonging to a Verbandsgemeinde, a kind of collective municipality – in the Rhein-Hunsrück-Kreis (district) in Rhineland-Palatinate, Germany. It belongs to the Verbandsgemeinde of Kastellaun, whose seat is in the like-named town.

== Geography ==
=== Location ===
The municipality lies in the Hunsrück about 2 km east of Kastellaun. The countryside is hilly with many fields, meadows and woods.

=== Constituent communities ===
Hollnich's Ortsteile are the main centre – also called Hollnich – Rothenbusch and Gammelshausen.

== Name ==
The municipality's name has varied in spelling over time, with the forms Hohlonich, Holonich, Hohlemich, Hohlnich, Kollnig, Holineych, Hulnich and finally Hollnich all known to history. What is not clear to history, however, is the name's origin. Interpretations range from the designation of a settlement bei der hohlen Eiche (“by the hollow oak”) with unreliable secretaries then corrupting the spelling, to a Germanic-Celtic placename with a typical —ig ending.

== History ==
In 1310, Hollnich had its first documentary mention, along with several local fiefs, in the Sponheimisches Gefälleregister, a taxation register kept by the County of Sponheim. About 1360, Heinrich the Elder, Lord at Ehrenberg, indicated that he had been enfeoffed with the village of Hollnich by Count Wilhelm von Katzenelnbogen. In the time that followed, Hollnich was mentioned several times in documents in connection with the Ehrenbergs’ ownership matters and taxation obligations, until in 1492, Landgrave Wilhelm of Hesse enfeoffed Johann, Vogt of Hunolstein, with the taxes in oats, chickens and money at Hollnich.

The Landgraves of Hesse held high court jurisdiction in Hollnich while the Counts of Sponheim held the low jurisdiction. Beginning in the 16th century, the two lordships repeatedly found themselves at odds with each other over serfdom rights and taxes. The disagreements were settled lastingly and bindingly only in 1788 by the Reichskammergericht.

From October 1794 to 1 January 1814, Hollnich belonged to the Department of Rhin-et-Moselle, the Arrondissement of Simmern, the Canton of Kastellaun and the Mairie (“Mayoralty”) of Gödenroth. On 20 November 1815, Hollnich became Prussian and was assigned to the Bürgermeisterei (“Mayoralty”) of Kastellaun and the district of Simmern. The administrative arrangements have changed since then only insofar as a new district has been created by merging the former district of Simmern with that of Sankt Goar to form the Rhein-Hunsrück-Kreis, and also the Amt of Kastellaun has become the Verbandsgemeinde of Kastellaun. This administrative reform came about after the Second World War, in 1969, in the newly founded state of Rhineland-Palatinate. Hollnich remained, as it had been before, a self-administering municipality.

=== Gammelshausen ===
Gammelshausen formerly belonged to the municipality of Roth, but ecclesiastically to Kastellaun.

This estate, too, had its first documentary mention in 1310 in the Sponheimisches Gefälleregister. In the Middle Ages, it was a parish property of the Kastellaun church. It never seemed to hold very much importance, as witnessed by the dearth of records that mention it, although a reference from 1672 states that the estate was earning the clergyman at Kastellaun income from land tenancy and oats. It was quite likely unpopulated in earlier times. What is known is that by 1832, it had only one homestead. In 1843, it had 48 inhabitants, growing to 68 in 1890 and 84 in 1950.

By the late 18th century, the Gamelshäuser Hof, as it was known, was not earning anybody anything, and so it was put up for auction. The buyer was a one Johann Friedrich Hildenbrand from Bacharach, whose great plans, not only for farming there but also for building a linen and cotton factory, as well as a brandy distillery, all fell through. Later, the estate was auctioned off again, this time without any plans for houses or businesses to be built.

Little is known of Gammelshausen's history over the last two centuries. Worthy of note, however, is the Hollnich council's reaction to a move on 10 December 1953 to amalgamate Gammelshausen with the municipality. Proceedings in Roth on that day put it to the council that an agreement with Hollnich's mayor on 19 April 1939 had amounted to amalgamation. Hollnich council, however, voted unanimously not to acknowledge what in their view was an unlawful act (the mayor in 1939, after all, would have been a Nazi). The matter reached the highest administrative tribunal, but there was no change in the ruling. Thus, Hollnich had to abide by the decision and acknowledge Gammelshausen as a Hollnich Ortsteil.

=== Rothenbusch ===
Rothenbusch's birth, at least as a settlement, dates only from the late 1960s. Until this time, the name existed as one for the rural cadastral area in this place, but there was no identifiable population centre. Hollnich council decided in June 1968 to open the area to development. Most of the building took place in the 1970s, and it has since become the municipality's most heavily populated centre.

== Politics ==
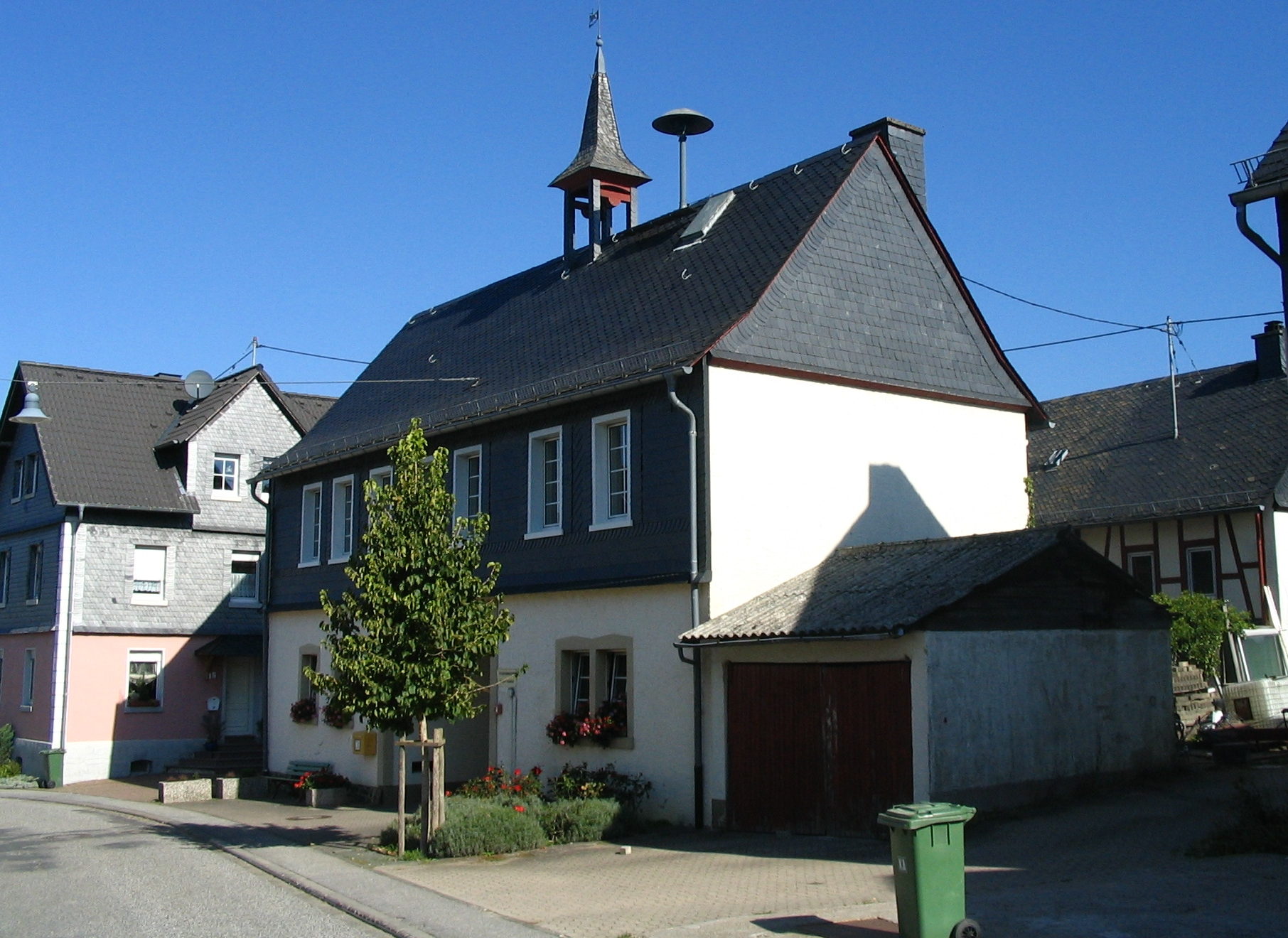
Municipal centre in Hollnich

=== Municipal council ===
The council is made up of 8 council members, who were elected at the municipal election held on 7 June 2009, and the honorary mayor as chairman.

=== Mayor ===
Hollnich's mayor is Rainer Scherer.

=== Coat of arms ===
The German blazon reads: In Gold ein doppelreihig rot-silbern geschachtelter Schräglinksbalken. Oben ein wachsender, herschauender, blau gekrönter Löwe. Unten ein roter Busch.

The municipality's arms might in English heraldic language be described thus: Or a bend sinister countercompony argent and gules issuant from which a lion rampant guardant of the third crowned azure, and below which a bush of the third.

The three charges in the arms stand for the municipality's three centres. The lion refers to the main centre, also called Hollnich, which belonged to the Landgraviate of Hesse until 1802 (Amt of Rheinfels). This is symbolized by the heraldic device borne by the Counts of Katzenelnbogen. The “bend sinister countercompony” (diagonal chequered stripe) is inspired by the “chequy” arms borne by the Counts of Sponheim, who held the low court jurisdiction in Hollnich, but it stands first and foremost for the outlying centre of Gammelshausen, which in ecclesiastical history was attached to the Sponheim holding of Kastellaun through a property that the Kastellaun church owned there. The last charge is for the newest of Hollnich's centres. It is a red bush, according to the blazon, and in German, “red bush” is roten Busch (at least in the accusative case), making the charge canting for “Rothenbusch”, which is pronounced exactly the same way.

The arms have been borne since 31 October 1990.

== Culture and sightseeing ==
=== Buildings ===
The following are listed buildings or sites in Rhineland-Palatinate’s Directory of Cultural Monuments:

- Beside Dorfstraße 16 – wellshaft and wellhouse built of slate quarrystone
- Dorfstraße 22 – timber-frame house, slated, hipped mansard roof, first third of the 19th century, commercial wing; whole complex of buildings

=== Sport and leisure ===
Hollnich is a good starting point for outings, with ideal connections with hiking and cycle paths, including the nearby Schinderhannes-Radweg. The castle town of Kastellaun is also nearby. Right on the Schinderhannes-Radweg in Hollnich is a playground and sporting ground suitable for children.

=== Local dialect ===
The area's local dialect is Hunsrückisch.

== Economy and infrastructure ==
=== Transport ===
Hollnich is linked to the road network only over District Roads (Kreisstraßen), and has had no railway link since the Kastellaun–Boppard line discontinued service on 28 May 1983. Landesstraße (State Road) 219, which links Kastellaun and Simmern, may be reached over Kreisstraße (District Road) 35. The local roads also link with the nearby Hunsrückhöhenstraße ("Hunsrück Heights Road", a scenic road across the Hunsrück built originally as a military road on Hermann Göring's orders), affording access to destinations farther afield.

=== Economy ===
Agriculture, once the mainstay of the local people's livelihood, nowadays counts only two full-time operations and fewer than five more that work the fields as a secondary income earner. Most workers in Hollnich commute to work in the surrounding towns and cities. Since the outlying centre of Rothenbusch came into being, the number of white-collar and public-sector workers living in the municipality has risen sharply. The area around Hollnich is also bound with the tourism industry centred on Kastellaun.

=== Established businesses ===
Businesses in Hollnich include a small plastics factory, a handicrafts business (radio and television technology), an inn in the old school, a hotel and a pension business.
