= Kastellaun (Verbandsgemeinde) =

Municipality in Rhineland-Palatinate, Germany

- Verbandsgemeinde
- Location of Kastellaun within Rhein-Hunsrück-Kreis district
- Interactive map of Kastellaun
- Location within Germany Location within Rhineland-Palatinate
- Coordinates: 50°04′N 7°27′E
- Country: Germany
- State: Rhineland-Palatinate
- District: Rhein-Hunsrück-Kreis
- Seat: Kastellaun
- Subdivisions: 19 municipalities

Area
  - Total: 180.63 km^{2} (69.74 sq mi)

Population (2025-12-31)
  - Total: 16,238
  - Density: 89.896/km^{2} (232.83/sq mi)
- Time zone: UTC+01:00 (CET)
  - Summer (DST): UTC+02:00 (CEST)
- Website: www.kastellaun.de

Kastellaun is a Verbandsgemeinde ("collective municipality") in the Rhein-Hunsrück district, in Rhineland-Palatinate, Germany. Its seat is in Kastellaun. On 1 July 2014 it was expanded with 3 municipalities from the former Verbandsgemeinde Treis-Karden.

The Verbandsgemeinde Kastellaun consists of the following Ortsgemeinden ("local municipalities"):

1. Alterkülz
2. Bell
3. Beltheim
4. Braunshorn
5. Buch
6. Dommershausen
7. Gödenroth
8. Hasselbach
9. Hollnich
10. Kastellaun
11. Korweiler
12. Lahr
13. Mastershausen
14. Michelbach
15. Mörsdorf
16. Roth
17. Spesenroth
18. Uhler
19. Zilshausen
