= Gödenroth =

- Municipality
- Coat of arms

- Location of Gödenroth within Rhein-Hunsrück-Kreis district
- Interactive map of Gödenroth
- Location within Germany Location within Rhineland-Palatinate
- Coordinates: 50°5′16″N 7°29′28″E
- Country: Germany
- State: Rhineland-Palatinate
- District: Rhein-Hunsrück-Kreis
- Municipal assoc.: Kastellaun

Government
  - Mayor (2019–24): Gerd Emmel

Area
  - Total: 6.81 km^{2} (2.63 sq mi)
- Elevation: 415 m (1,362 ft)

Population (2025-12-31)
  - Total: 461
  - Density: 67.7/km^{2} (175/sq mi)
- Time zone: UTC+01:00 (CET)
  - Summer (DST): UTC+02:00 (CEST)
- Postal codes: 56290
- Dialling codes: 06762
- Vehicle registration: SIM
- Website: www.goedenroth.de

Gödenroth (German pronunciation: [ˈɡøːdn̩ʁoːt]) is an Ortsgemeinde – a municipality belonging to a Verbandsgemeinde, a kind of collective municipality – in the Rhein-Hunsrück-Kreis (district) in Rhineland-Palatinate, Germany. It belongs to the Verbandsgemeinde of Kastellaun, whose seat is in the like-named town.

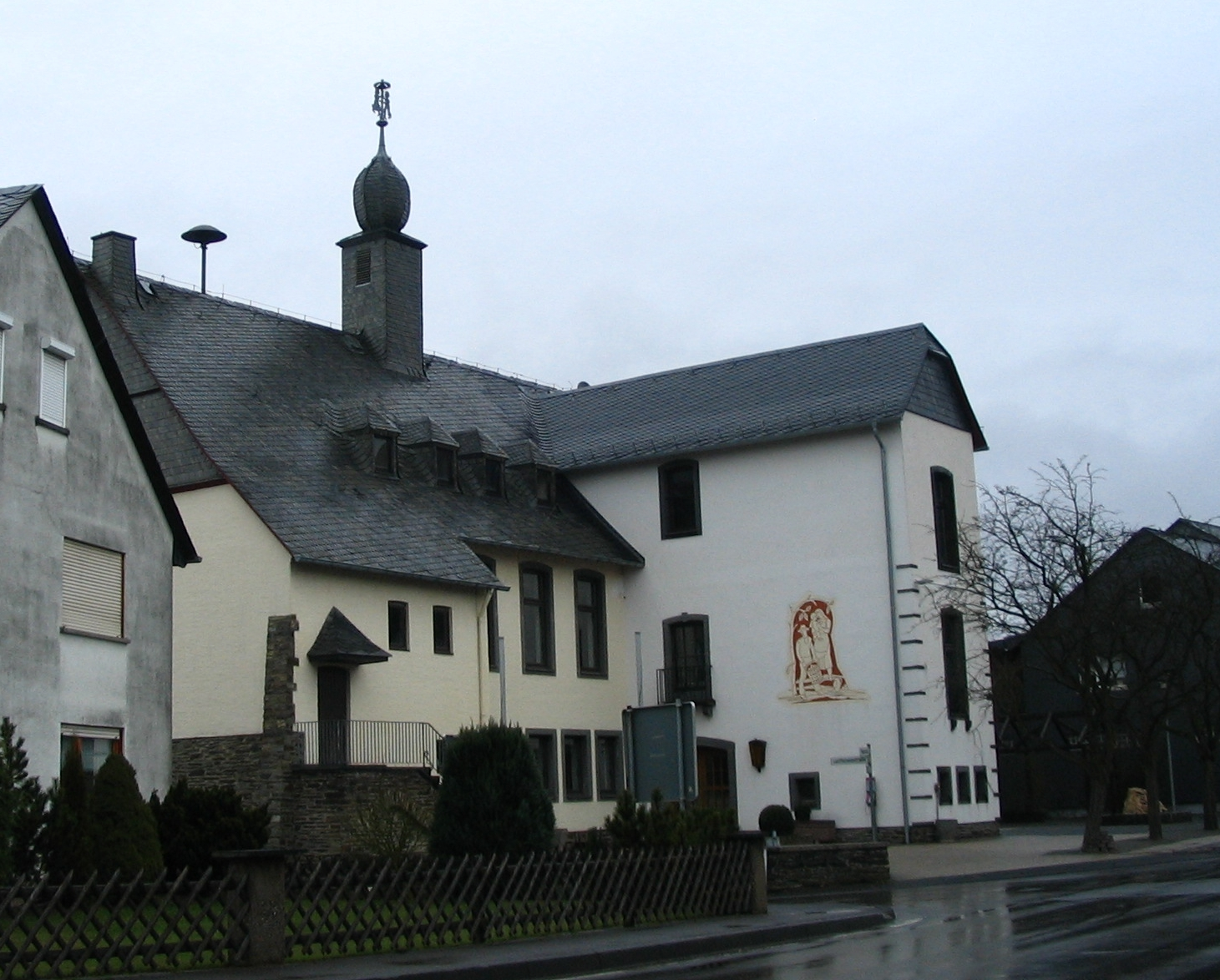
Community centre on the Hunsrückhöhenstraße

== Geography ==
=== Location ===
The municipality lies in the Hunsrück.

=== Constituent communities ===
Some 150 m from Gödenroth going towards Hollnich is a two-house hamlet called “der Kleinbergerhof”. It is home to two families and is a constituent part of Gödenroth.

== History ==
The village belonged in the Middle Ages to the County of Sponheim. The family Boos von Waldeck and the Counts of Katzenelnbogen drew income from the village. Beginning in 1794, Gödenroth lay under French rule. In 1815 it was assigned to the Kingdom of Prussia at the Congress of Vienna. Since 1946, it has been part of the then newly founded state of Rhineland-Palatinate.

=== Religion ===
Gödenroth has an Evangelical church with a congregation of some 339. Together with several other nearby places it forms the Evangelical parish of Gödenroth-Heyweiler within the church district of Simmern-Trarbach. Notable clergyman in this parish have been, among others, Friedrich Langensiepen, Manfred Josuttis and Klaus-Peter Jörns.

== Politics ==
=== Municipal council ===
The council is made up of 8 council members, who were elected at the municipal election held on 7 June 2009, and the honorary mayor as chairman.

=== Mayor ===
Gödenroth's mayor is Gerd Emmel.

=== Coat of arms ===
The municipality's website devotes a great deal of text to explaining the charges in its arms, but unfortunately, this does not include a blazon.

The red and silver fields refer to the village's former allegiance to the “Hinder” County of Sponheim, which beginning in the 14th century was the local landholder. The three gold ears of wheat stand for the three watermills that ran within Gödenroth's municipal limits in the Deimerbach valley until 1949, and also for the municipality's character, which is still agricultural today. The building standing as a charge in the arms is the old 18th-century town hall, which was dismantled and reassembled at the “Roscheider Hof” open-air museum near Konz. The clearing hoe stands for the way the village arose, namely as a clearing, which surely happened in the period of Frankish expansion in the 10th to 12th century. It is also, in a way, a canting charge, at least for the last syllable in the municipality's name (the —roth ending stems from the same root as the German verb roden, meaning “clear”, with reference to woods, and the German name for this tool is Rodehacke, literally “clearing hoe”).

== Culture and sightseeing ==
=== Buildings ===
The following are listed buildings or sites in Rhineland-Palatinate’s Directory of Cultural Monuments:

- Hauptstraße 33a – Evangelical church; Early Baroque aisleless church, 17th or 18th century, 1844-1851 transept and apse added, quarrystone; whole complex of buildings with graveyard
- Hauptstraße 33 – former school; timber-frame house, slated, mid 19th century; whole complex of buildings
- Hauptstraße 36 – former rectory; building with half-hipped roof, slated, earlier half of the 19th century; whole complex of buildings with garden and wall
- Hauptstraße 65 – timber-frame house, partly solid and slated, hipped mansard roof, marked 1824
- Im Faller 4 – timber-frame house, partly solid and slated, marked 1783
- Raiffeisenstraße 2 – L-shaped estate; timber-frame house, partly slated, 19th century
- Salzgass 3 – timber-frame house, sided, hipped mansard roof, early 19th century

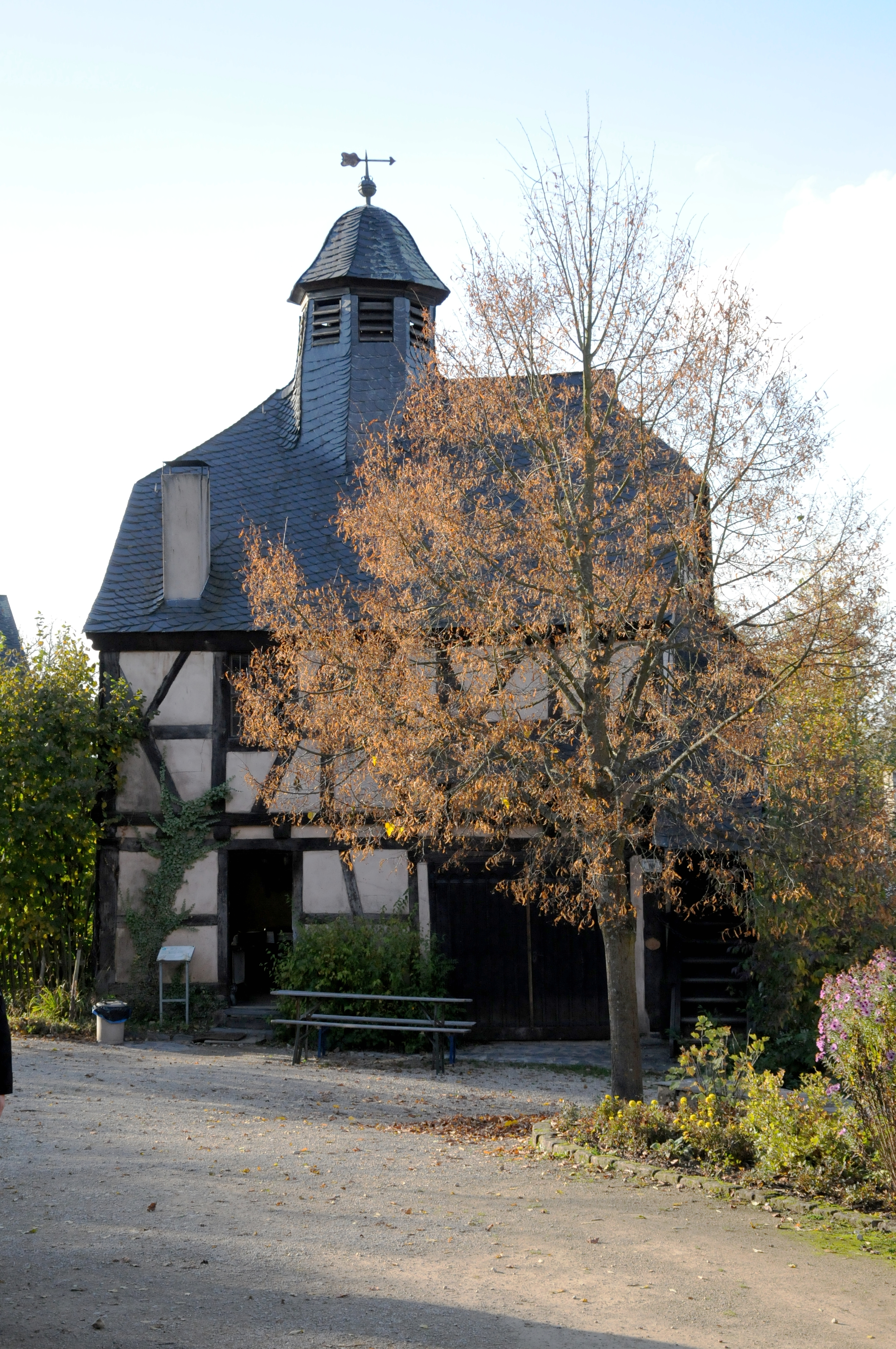
Former town hall

Gödenroth’s former town hall became in 1974 the first building to be moved in pieces and reassembled at the “Roscheider Hof” open-air museum. It stands as an example of town halls in Evangelical municipalities in the Hunsrück. Catholic municipalities were subject to the Electorate of Trier, which would brook no municipal self-governance. The ground floor was for a time used as a municipal poorhouse. The carriage house served first to lodge small animals and then later to house the firefighting equipment.

=== Regular events ===
Besides the village kermis held on the second weekend in August and the fire brigade festival held on the second weekend in September, there are also Carnival events and a sport festival. A fortnightly “seniors’ afternoon” and a “village evening” for getting acquainted and playing together each Monday round out the village's events.

Among the village's clubs are the sport club, the fire brigade, a choir and a theatre group.

== Economy and infrastructure ==
=== Transport ===
The nearest Autobahn interchanges are Emmelshausen, Pfalzfeld and Laudert on the A 61. The nearest railway station is at Emmelshausen, 11 km away. Running there and also to Koblenz, Kastellaun and Simmern are bus routes.

Since the village is split by Bundesstraße 327, the Hunsrückhöhenstraße (“Hunsrück Heights Road”, a scenic road across the Hunsrück built originally as a military road on Hermann Göring’s orders), the local inhabitants have been trying for more than 40 years to have a village bypass built. It has since been decided that an alignment to the south would be best, as the natural area in the north should be preserved. The process for finalizing the planning for this project was completed in 2009. Nevertheless, construction will not begin until funding becomes available. According to estimates, each day, well over 12,000 vehicles pass through Gödenroth.

=== Facilities and businesses ===
- Primary school
- Kindergarten
- Bank
- Sporting ground
- Grocer's shop
- Carpentry shop
- Small appliances and automotive
- Metalworking operation
- Roofing business
