= Roth, Virginia =

Unincorporated community in Virginia, United States

Coordinates: 37°14′41″N 81°58′22″W

Roth is an unincorporated community in Buchanan County, Virginia, United States.

== History ==
A post office was established at Roth in 1938 and operated until 1955. The community was named for E. H. Roth, a railroad official.
