= Uhler =

- Municipality
- Coat of arms

- Location of Uhler within Rhein-Hunsrück-Kreis district
- Interactive map of Uhler
- Location within Germany Location within Rhineland-Palatinate
- Coordinates: 50°5′17.12″N 7°25′53.83″E
- Country: Germany
- State: Rhineland-Palatinate
- District: Rhein-Hunsrück-Kreis
- Municipal assoc.: Kastellaun

Government
  - Mayor (2019–24): Hans-Herbert Laux

Area
  - Total: 5.58 km^{2} (2.15 sq mi)
- Elevation: 410 m (1,350 ft)

Population (2025-12-31)
  - Total: 366
  - Density: 65.6/km^{2} (170/sq mi)
- Time zone: UTC+01:00 (CET)
  - Summer (DST): UTC+02:00 (CEST)
- Postal codes: 56290
- Dialling codes: 06762
- Vehicle registration: SIM
- Website: www.ort-uhler.de

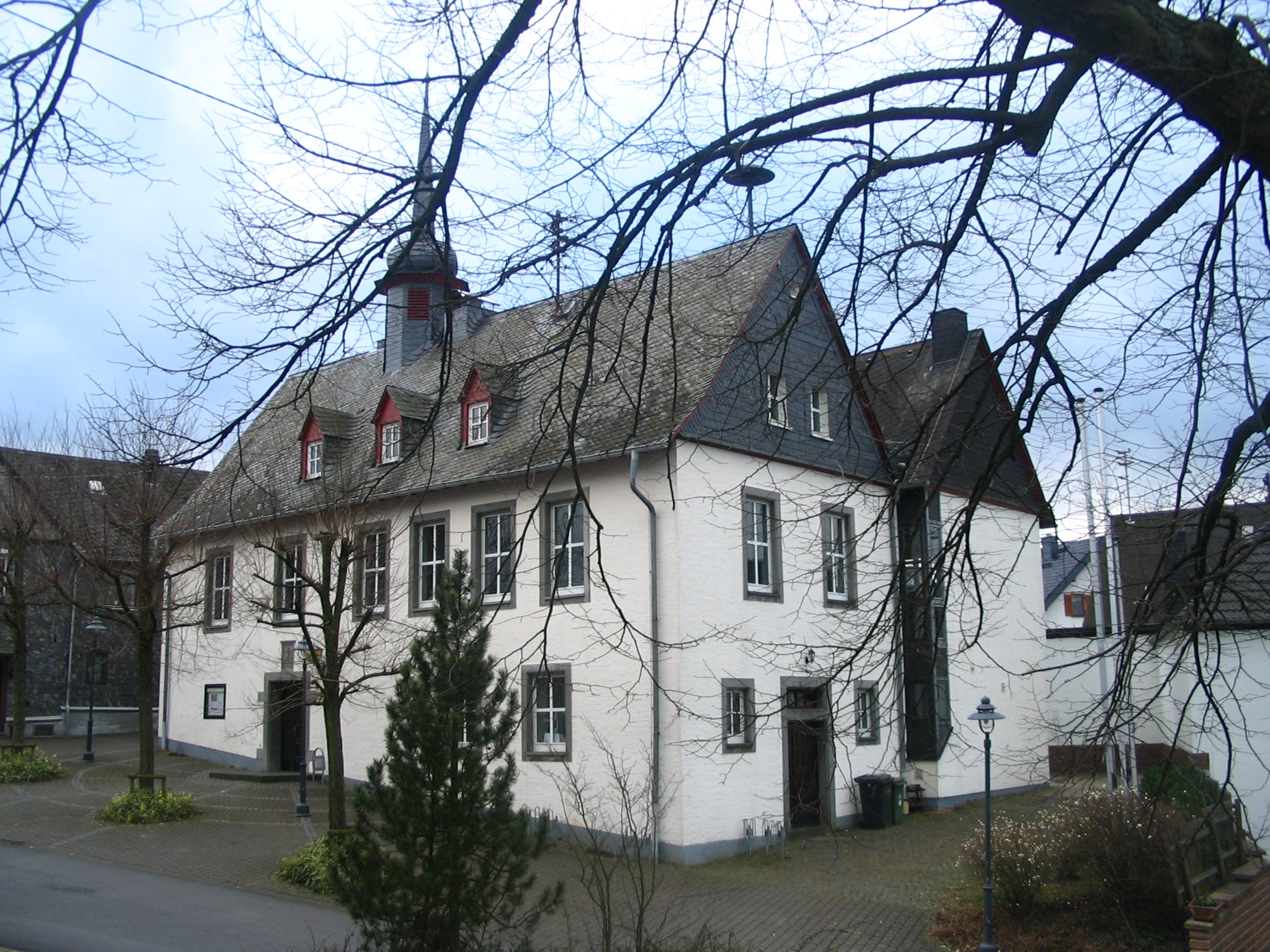
Municipal centre

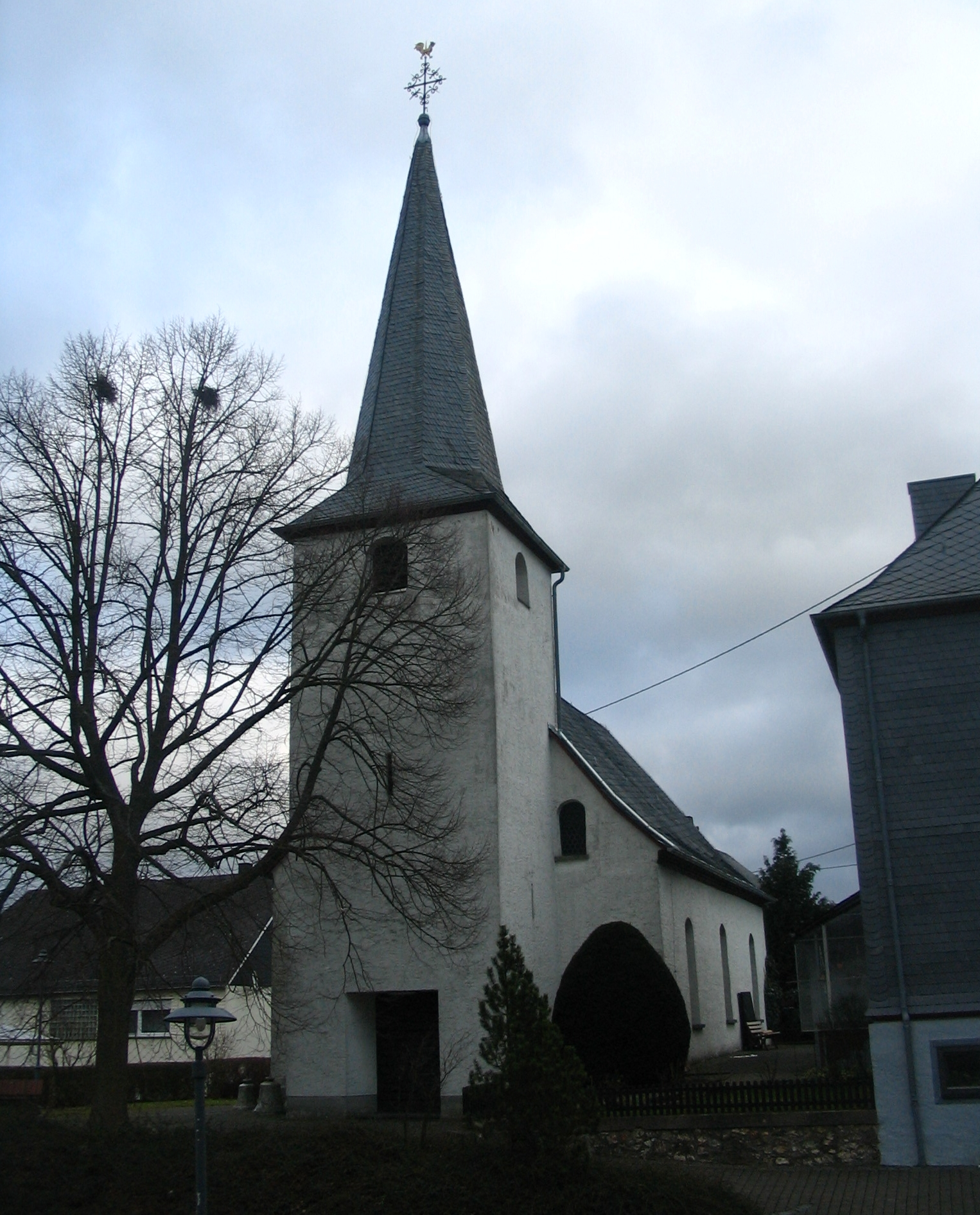
Church

Uhler (German pronunciation: [ˈuːlɐ]) is an Ortsgemeinde – a municipality belonging to a Verbandsgemeinde, a kind of collective municipality – in the Rhein-Hunsrück-Kreis (district) in Rhineland-Palatinate, Germany. It belongs to the Verbandsgemeinde of Kastellaun, whose seat is in the like-named town.

== Geography ==
=== Location ===
The municipality lies on a ridge in the central Hunsrück, roughly 12 km southeast of the Moselle at Treis-Karden, 3 km north of Kastellaun and 2 km north of the Hunsrückhöhenstraße ('Hunsrück Heights Road', a scenic road across the Hunsrück built originally as a military road on Hermann Göring’s orders). Also belonging to Uhler are the outlying homesteads of Gräfenmühle, Junkersmühle, Neumühle and Sulzmühle.

== History ==
In 1200, Uhler had its first documentary mention in a document from St. Maximin’s Abbey in Trier as Owilre. Uhler belonged to the “Three-Lord Court” in Beltheim. Beginning in 1794, Uhler lay under French rule. In 1814 it was assigned to the Kingdom of Prussia at the Congress of Vienna. Since 1946, it has been part of the then newly founded state of Rhineland-Palatinate.

== Politics ==
=== Municipal council ===
The council is made up of six council members, who were elected by majority vote at the municipal election held on 7 June 2009, and the honorary mayor as chairman.

=== Mayor ===
Uhler's mayor is Hans-Herbert Laux.

=== Coat of arms ===
The municipality's arms might be described thus: Below a chief countercompony gules and argent, tierced in mantle, dexter argent an eagle's sinister wing sable, sinister argent a cross of the first and in base gules a bugle-horn of the second.

The arms refer to the lords of the "Three-Lord Court" in Beltheim. The chief, namely the band at the top of the escutcheon with the two-row chequered pattern (“countercompony”), stands for the Counts of Sponheim, the red cross on the sinister (armsbearer's left, viewer's right) side for the Electorate of Trier and the bugle-horn for the Lords of Braunshorn. The charge on the dexter (armsbearer's right, viewer's left) side, the eagle's wing, was an heraldic device borne by the knightly family of Keyser von "Owilre".

== Culture and sightseeing ==
=== Buildings ===
The following are listed buildings or sites in Rhineland-Palatinate’s Directory of Cultural Monuments:

- Evangelical church, Hauptstraße 25A – aisleless church, about 1700, conversion marked 1799, Romanesque west tower, raised about 1800; whole complex of buildings with square
- Hauptstraße 26 – timber-frame Quereinhaus (a combination residential and commercial house divided for these two purposes down the middle, perpendicularly to the street), half-hipped roof, 18th century
- Sulzmühle, northwest of Uhler – timber-frame house, clapboard, marked 1726; waterwheel and millstones preserved
