= Roth (Rednitz) =

River in Bavaria, Germany

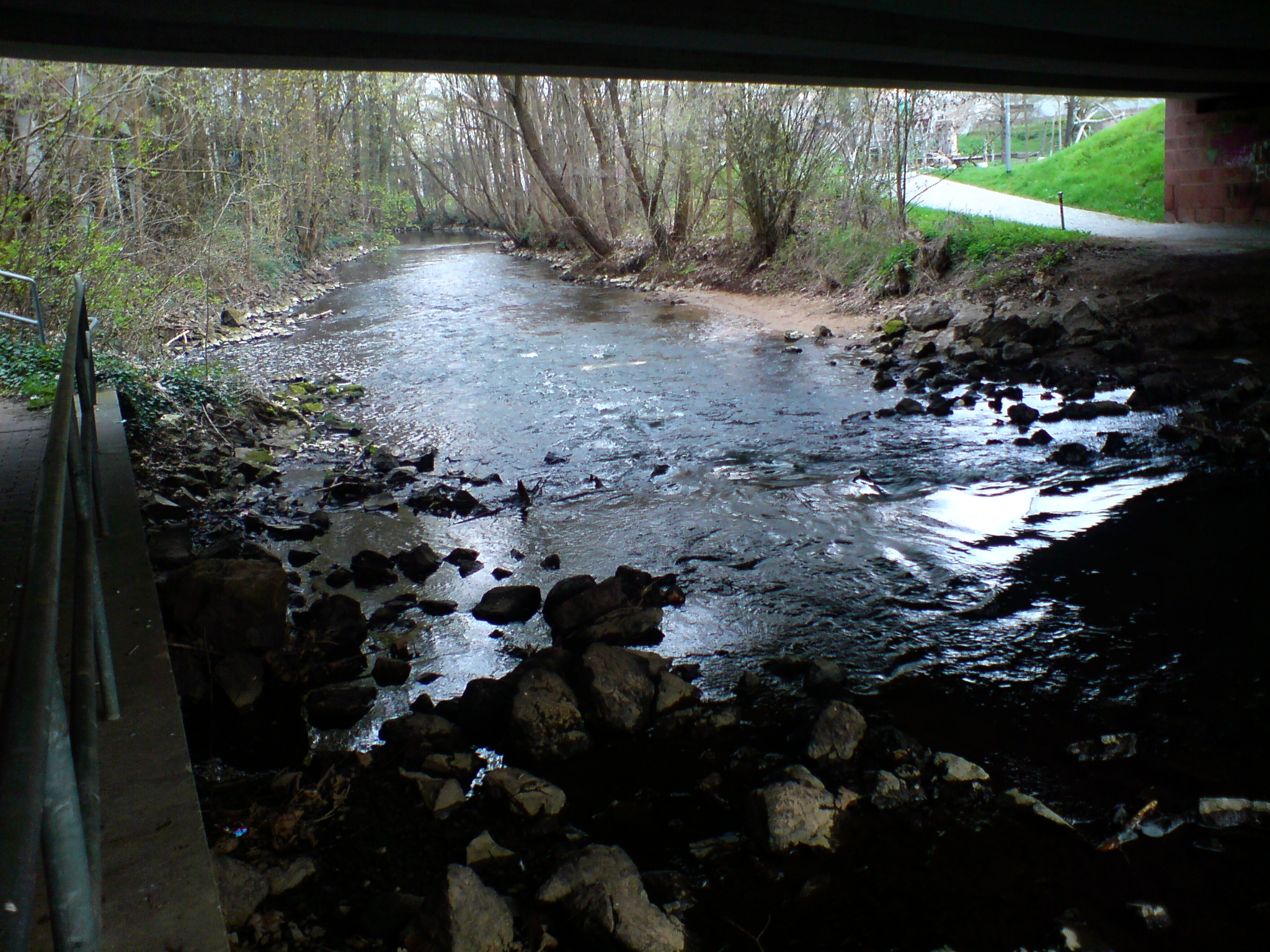
- The Roth in Roth, shortly before its mouth

Location
- Country: Germany
- State: Bavaria

Physical characteristics
- Mouth
  - location: Rednitz
  - coordinates: 49.2481°N 11.0872°E
- Length: 23.6 km (14.7 mi)

Basin features
- Progression: Rednitz→ Regnitz→ Main→ Rhine→ North Sea

Roth (German pronunciation: [ʁoːt]) is a river of Bavaria, Germany. It is a right tributary of the Rednitz in the town Roth.

== See also ==
- List of rivers of Bavaria
