= Who's Who in Tudor England 1485–1603 =

Who's Who in Tudor England 1485–1603 is a biographical dictionary by C. R. N. Routh, one of the seven volumes of the set Who's Who in British History. It was originally published in 1990 by Shepeard-Walwyn, and reprinted in the US by Stackpole Books in 432 pages.

== Resources ==
- Who's Who in Tudor England 1485–1603, C. R. N. Routh. Stackpole Books, Mechanicsburg, PA. 2001 ISBN 0-8117-1639-2
