= Rothe =

Rothe or Roethe is a surname. Notable people with the surname include:

- Bendt Rothe, Danish actor
- Camilla Rothe (born 1974), German physician and tropical medicine expert
- David Rothe (1573–1650), Irish Roman Catholic bishop
- Edward J. Roethe (1878–1952), American politician
- Erich Rothe (1895–1988), German-born American mathematician
- Jessica Rothe (born 1987), American actress
- Johannes Rothe, (1628–1702), prophetic preacher and Fifth Monarchist
- Heinrich August Rothe (1773–1842), German mathematician
- Henry Edgar Roethe (1866–1939), American politician
- Mechtild Rothe (1947), German politician
- Paul Rothe (1890-1961), German flying ace
- Peter Rothe (born 1935), German art director
- Richard Roethe (1865–1944), German military officer
- Richard Rothe (1799–1867), German theologian
- Rudolf Rothe (1873–1942), German mathematician
- Rudolph Rothe (1802–1877), Danish landscape architect
- Sjur Røthe (born 1988), Norwegian cross-country skier
- Utz Rothe (born 1940), Austrian artist
- Ursula Rothe (classicist), Australian classicist

== Places ==
- Rothe, Lesotho

== See also ==
- Roth (disambiguation)
