= Alterkülz =

- Municipality
- Coat of arms

- Location of Alterkülz within Rhein-Hunsrück-Kreis district
- Interactive map of Alterkülz
- Location within Germany Location within Rhineland-Palatinate
- Coordinates: 50°01′56″N 7°27′57″E
- Country: Germany
- State: Rhineland-Palatinate
- District: Rhein-Hunsrück-Kreis
- Municipal assoc.: Kastellaun

Area
  - Total: 7.58 km^{2} (2.93 sq mi)
- Elevation: 380 m (1,250 ft)

Population (2025-12-31)
  - Total: 385
  - Density: 50.8/km^{2} (132/sq mi)
- Time zone: UTC+01:00 (CET)
  - Summer (DST): UTC+02:00 (CEST)
- Postal codes: 56288
- Dialling codes: 06762
- Vehicle registration: SIM
- Website: www.alterkuelz.de

Alterkülz is an Ortsgemeinde – a municipality belonging to a Verbandsgemeinde, a kind of collective municipality – in the Rhein-Hunsrück-Kreis (district) in Rhineland-Palatinate, Germany. It is also a tourism community (Fremdenverkehrsgemeinde).

== Geography ==
=== Location ===
The municipality lies in the Külzbach valley, stretching strikingly along Landesstraße (State Road) 108, which is known locally as Hauptstraße (“Main Street”) where it actually passes through the village. Its length along this road has led to Alterkülz being called the “Longest Village in the Hunsrück”. Also belonging to the municipality is the outlying centre of Osterkülzmühle in the Osterkülz valley, southeast of the main centre.

Alterkülz's neighbours, by compass direction, are as follows:

== History ==
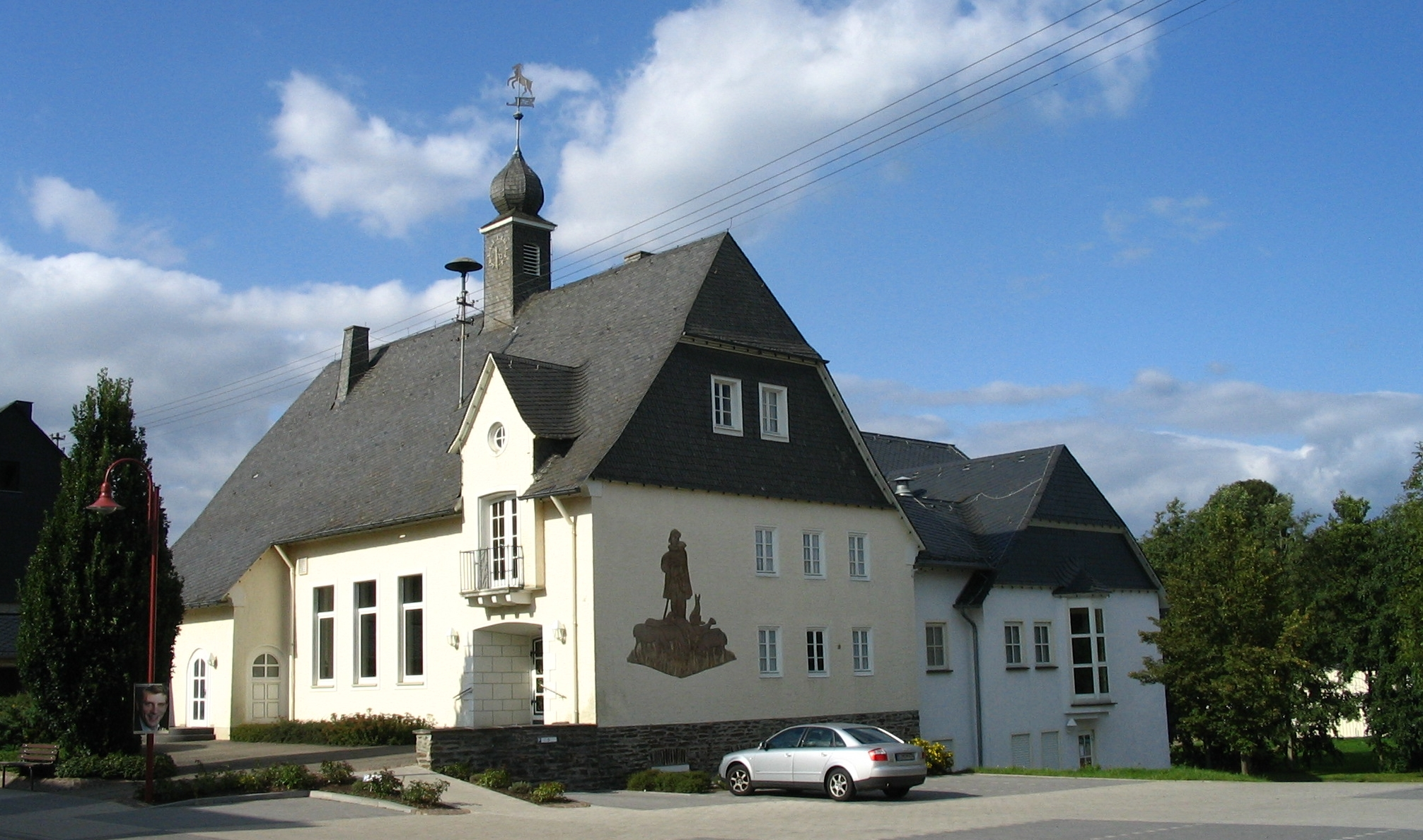
The parish hall stands in the village centre.

Alterkülz belonged until 1417 to the “Further” County of Sponheim, and locally to the Amt of Kastellaun. After this line of the Sponheims died out, the village went with Kastellaun to the “Hinder” part of the County.

Over the centuries, Alterkülz grew together from several villages: Unterdorf (“Lower Village”), Mitteldorf (“Middle Village”), Überbach and Wehr. As late as 1865, the now Ortsteil of Wehr was mentioned as a hamlet in its own right.

On the way out of the village to the south, near the Külzbach, the local river, are found remnants of a mediaeval iron smelter and what is left of the mine whence the ore came, the Grube Eid. Also found there is a slope on which once stood a Roman estate, a villa rustica.

From 1901 to 1983, the village was a stop on the old Simmern–Kastellaun–Boppard Hunsrückbahn (railway). At the beginning of the 21st century, the former railway right-of-way was converted into an asphalt-paved cycle and hiking path, the Schinderhannes-Radweg, named after a famous German outlaw.

In 2005, the municipality reached fifth place in the area in the state contest Unser Dorf hat Zukunft (“Our village has a future”).

== Politics ==
=== Municipal council ===
The council is made up of 8 council members, who were elected at the municipal election held on 7 June 2009, and the honorary mayor as chairman.

=== Mayor ===
Alterkülz's mayor is Alfons Rockenbach.

=== Coat of arms ===
The German blazon reads: Im geteilten Schild oben in Schwarz ein aufspringender goldener Ziegenbock, beseitet von zwei goldenen Ähren, unten von Rot und Silber geschachtet, belegt mit schräggekreuzten schwarzen Schlägel und Hammer.

The municipality's arms might in English heraldic language be described thus: Per fess sable a billygoat springing between two ears of wheat couped in base Or and chequy of twenty-four gules and argent a hammer and a sledge per saltire of the first.

The red and silver checkerboard pattern in the lower half of the escutcheon refers to the village's former allegiance to the “Hinder” County of Sponheim and the Amt of Kastellaun. As early as 1283, Alterkülz was being mentioned in a few Sponheim documents (cule, kultze). The charge here, the hammer and sledge, recall the iron ore mining that was undertaken at the Grube Eid (mine) from 1780 (as it is established in historical records) until the First World War. The ears of wheat stand for agriculture, once every villager's occupation. Many lordships were enfeoffed here, the Sponheims, the Koppensteins, the Hunolsteins and the Bourscheids. The springing billygoat represents the outlying centre of Wehr, where the Wehrer Bick live, Bick being a local form of the German Böcke (“bucks”, “male animals”, and thus in this case, “billygoats”). The billygoat also graces the new town hall's roof.

The arms have been borne since 23 February 1981.

== Culture and sightseeing ==
=== Buildings ===
The following are listed buildings or sites in Rhineland-Palatinate’s Directory of Cultural Monuments:

- Evangelical church, Hauptstraße 12 – bipolar aisleless church, marked 1759; whole complex of buildings with graveyard
- Saint Joseph’s Catholic Chapel (Kapelle St. Josef), Dorfstraße 79 – slate quarrystone aisleless church, 1920/1921, architect Marx, Trier; whole complex of buildings with graveyard
- Hauptstraße 11 – Evangelical rectory; building with half-hipped roof, partly slated timber framing, marked 1786, barn
- Hauptstraße 28 – building with hipped mansard roof, partly slated timber framing, marked 1816, barn; whole complex of buildings
- Hauptstraße 30 – building with hipped mansard roof, partly slated timber framing, marked 1811, barn; whole complex of buildings
- Hauptstraße 31 – estate complex; timber-frame house, partly solid, hipped mansard roof, about 1900, timber-frame barn
- Hauptstraße 46 – building with hipped mansard roof, partly slated timber framing, early 19th century, barn, partly timber-frame; whole complex of buildings
- Near Hauptstraße 48 – warriors’ memorial 1914-1918; complex with sandstone relief slab, 1926
- Hauptstraße 109 – building with hipped mansard roof, partly slated, Swiss chalet style, 1922
- Laubacher Straße 10 – L-shaped estate; timber-frame house, plastered, 18th century, commercial wing
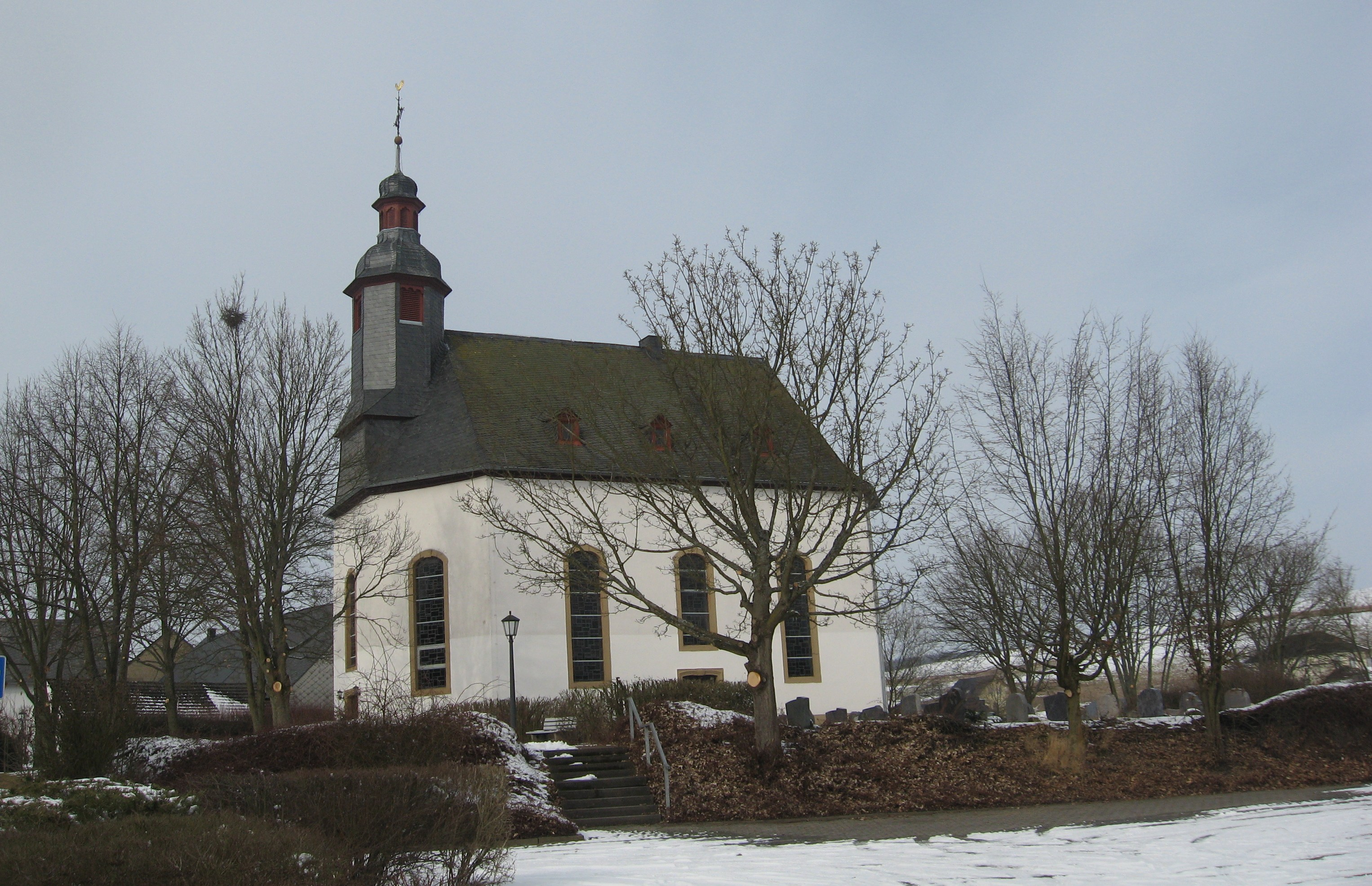
Hauptstraße 12: Evangelical church

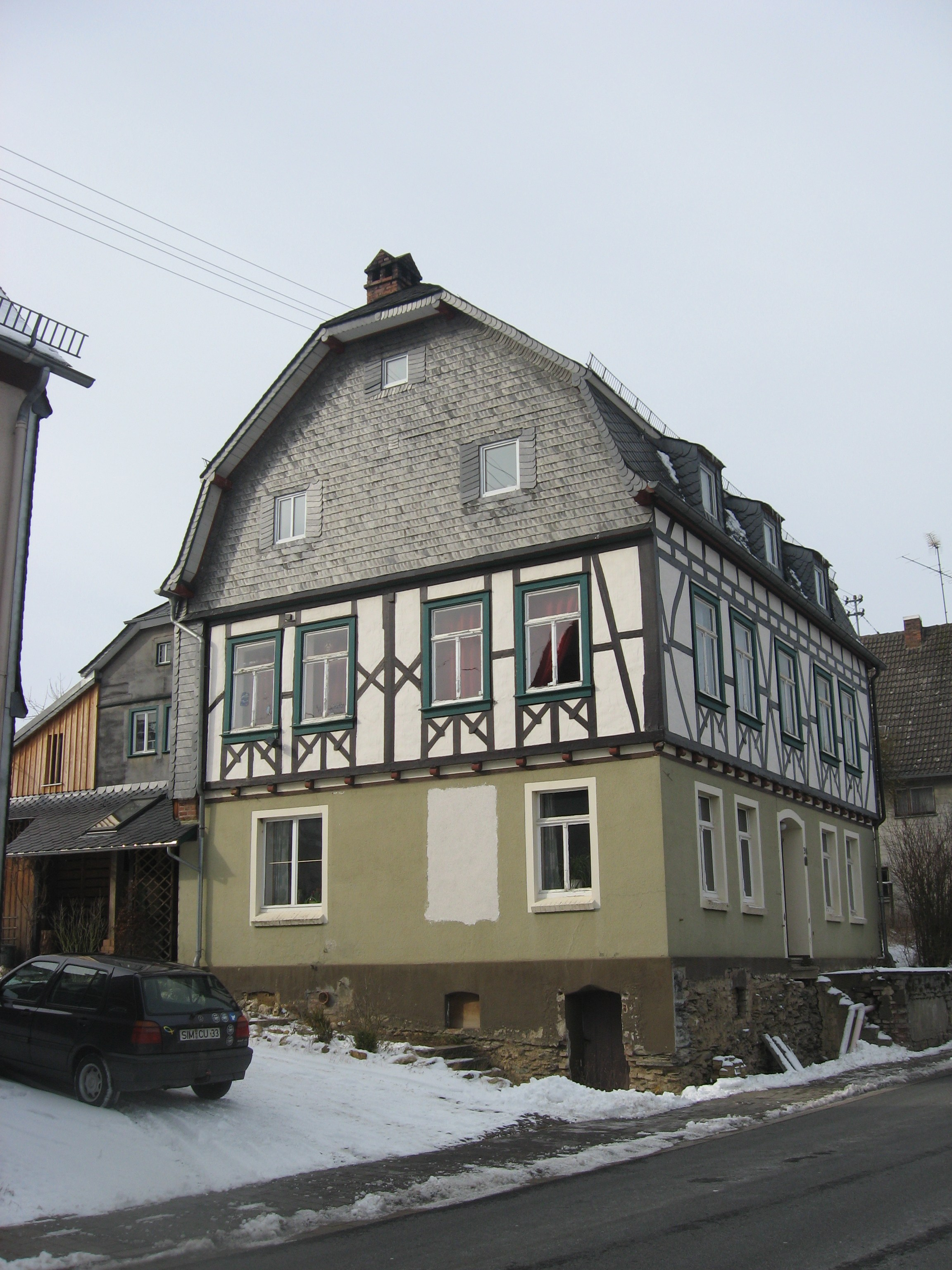
Hauptstraße 31: estate complex

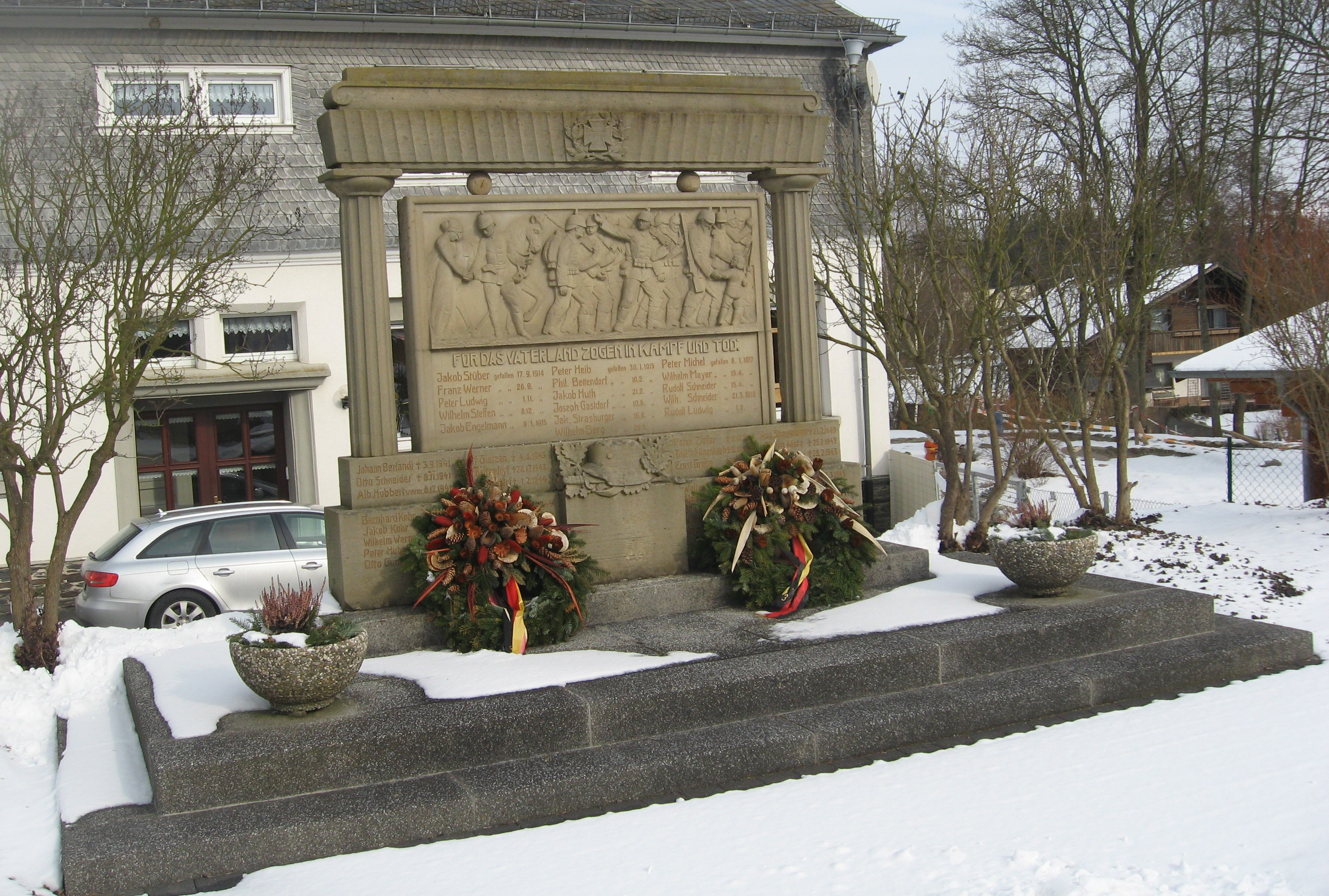
Near Hauptstraße 48: warriors’ memorial 1914-1918

=== Clubs ===
Name	Founded	No. of members	Chairperson	Activity	As at
Bauernverein (“Farmers’ Club”)	19th century	30	Horst Bender	Information, courses, fire insurance, representing interests in buying and selling land	1983
Evangelische Frauenhilfe (“Evangelical Women’s Aid”)	1932	60	Elisabeth Berg, Elli Schneider (Alterkülz)	Bible classes, singing at burials	1983
Frauengymnastikgruppe (“Women’s Gymnastic Group”)	1975	23	Ingrid Meurer	Women's sport	1983
Feuerwehrverein Alterkülz (“Alterkülz Firefighting Club”)	1934	21	Axel Werner	Firefighting practice, information evenings on fire prevention	2007
Gemischter Chor Alterkülz (Meisterchor) (“Alterkülz Mixed Choir – Master Choir”)	1830	36	Horst Peuter	Concerts, collaboration at village and social events, participation in singing festivals	2007
Jugendraum Alterkülz (“Alterkülz Youth Centre”)	1999	*	*	Social gathering	2007
Landfrauenvereinigung (“Country Women’s Association”)	1960	~36	Regina Messerle	Courses, informational trips, social events	2007
Musikverein Alterkülz e. V. (“Alterkülz Music Club”)	1924	60 active	Heinz-Walter Nowak	Concerts, collaboration at village events, participation in music festivals, training and developing youth's musical skills	2008
Spielvereinigung Oberkülztal (“Oberkülztal Games Club”)	1928	82 active	Jürgen Meurer	football, table tennis	2008

== Economy and infrastructure ==
=== Established businesses ===
Among others, there are a large steel building firm, a carpentry company specializing in building conservatories, a masonry business, an inn and several agricultural businesses. On a hill east of the village stands a wind farm with seven wind turbines made by Vestas.

== Famous people ==
- Sebastian Furck (about 1600-1655), 17th-century copper engraver born in Alterkülz
