= Dommershausen =

- Municipality
- Coat of arms

- Location of Dommershausen within Rhein-Hunsrück-Kreis district
- Interactive map of Dommershausen
- Location within Germany Location within Rhineland-Palatinate
- Coordinates: 50°8′37″N 7°23′52″E
- Country: Germany
- State: Rhineland-Palatinate
- District: Rhein-Hunsrück-Kreis
- Municipal assoc.: Kastellaun

Government
  - Mayor (2024–29): Dietmar Emmerich

Area
  - Total: 24.70 km^{2} (9.54 sq mi)
- Elevation: 340 m (1,120 ft)

Population (2025-12-31)
  - Total: 1,089
  - Density: 44.09/km^{2} (114.2/sq mi)
- Time zone: UTC+01:00 (CET)
  - Summer (DST): UTC+02:00 (CEST)
- Postal codes: 56290
- Dialling codes: 02605
- Vehicle registration: SIM
- Website: www.ortsgemeinde-dommershausen.de

Dommershausen is an Ortsgemeinde – a municipality belonging to a Verbandsgemeinde, a kind of collective municipality – in the Rhein-Hunsrück-Kreis (district) in Rhineland-Palatinate, Germany. It belongs to the Verbandsgemeinde of Kastellaun, whose seat is in the like-named town.

== Geography ==
=== Location ===
The municipality lies in the Hunsrück. The main centre, also called Dommershausen, lies on a ridge between the Baybach and Lützbach valleys. It has 451 inhabitants (as at 30 June 2009).

=== Neighbouring communities ===
Places near Dommershausen, including unincorporated ones, are Heyweiler, Sabershausen, Lahr, Lieg, Lütz, Eveshausen, Dorweiler, Macken and Beulich.

=== Constituent communities ===
Along with the main centre of Dommershausen, the municipality includes the three outlying Ortsteile of Dorweiler, Eveshausen and Sabershausen.

== History ==
In 1220, Dommershausen had its first documentary mention as Dumershusen. What the mention reveals is that Dumershusen was not subject to any kind of taxation. The village belonged to the Beltheim Court and thereby lay under three lordships: the Electorate of Trier, the Counts of Sponheim and the Lords of Braunshorn. After this last family died out, their share in the Court passed to the family Winneburg, and after this family also died out, the share passed to the family Metternich. Beginning in 1794, Dommershausen lay under French rule. In 1815 it was assigned to the Kingdom of Prussia at the Congress of Vienna. Since 1946, it has been part of the then newly founded state of Rhineland-Palatinate.

The municipality in its current form came into being on 17 March 1974 through the amalgamation of the old municipality of Dommershausen with the three formerly self-administering municipalities of Dorweiler, Eveshausen and Sabershausen.

== Politics ==
=== Municipal council ===
The council is made up of 16 council members, who were elected by proportional representation at the municipal election held on 9 June 2024, and the honorary mayor as chairman.

The municipal election held on 9 June 2024 yielded the following results:

	WG Emmerich	WG Olbermann	WG Kochhan	WG Vogel	All voter groups (sum)	Total
2024	6	5	4	1	16	16 seats

=== Mayor ===
Dommershausen’s mayor is Dietmar Emmerich.

=== Coat of arms ===
The municipality’s arms might be described thus: Quarterly, first azure a cross moline argent, second chequy of sixteen gules and argent, third argent three escallops sable and fourth gules three arming buckles pommy each surmounting the last in bend, sans tongues.

== Culture and sightseeing ==
=== Museums ===
Dommershausen’s former rectory from 1837/1838 has since 1992 housed the Vorderhunsrückmuseum (“Fore-Hunsrück Museum”), the Pies Archive and the Library for Personal and Municipal History. Permanent exhibits document the surgeons and Knochenflicker (“bone-menders”) from the family Pies as well as medical instruments from the past two millennia.

There are also changing exhibits about the Vorderhunsrück’s history. Gathered at the library are data from church books from the 16th to 19th century from some 1,400 places, particularly from the Rhine-Moselle-Nahe-Saar region, and also regional historical literature.

=== Jugendraum ===
In 2001, the Jugendraum – a youth centre – was opened in Dommershausen, at the same time as the new fire station. The mayor described the opening as a great stride for the municipality of Dommershausen.

=== Buildings ===
The following are listed buildings or sites in Rhineland-Palatinate’s Directory of Cultural Monuments:

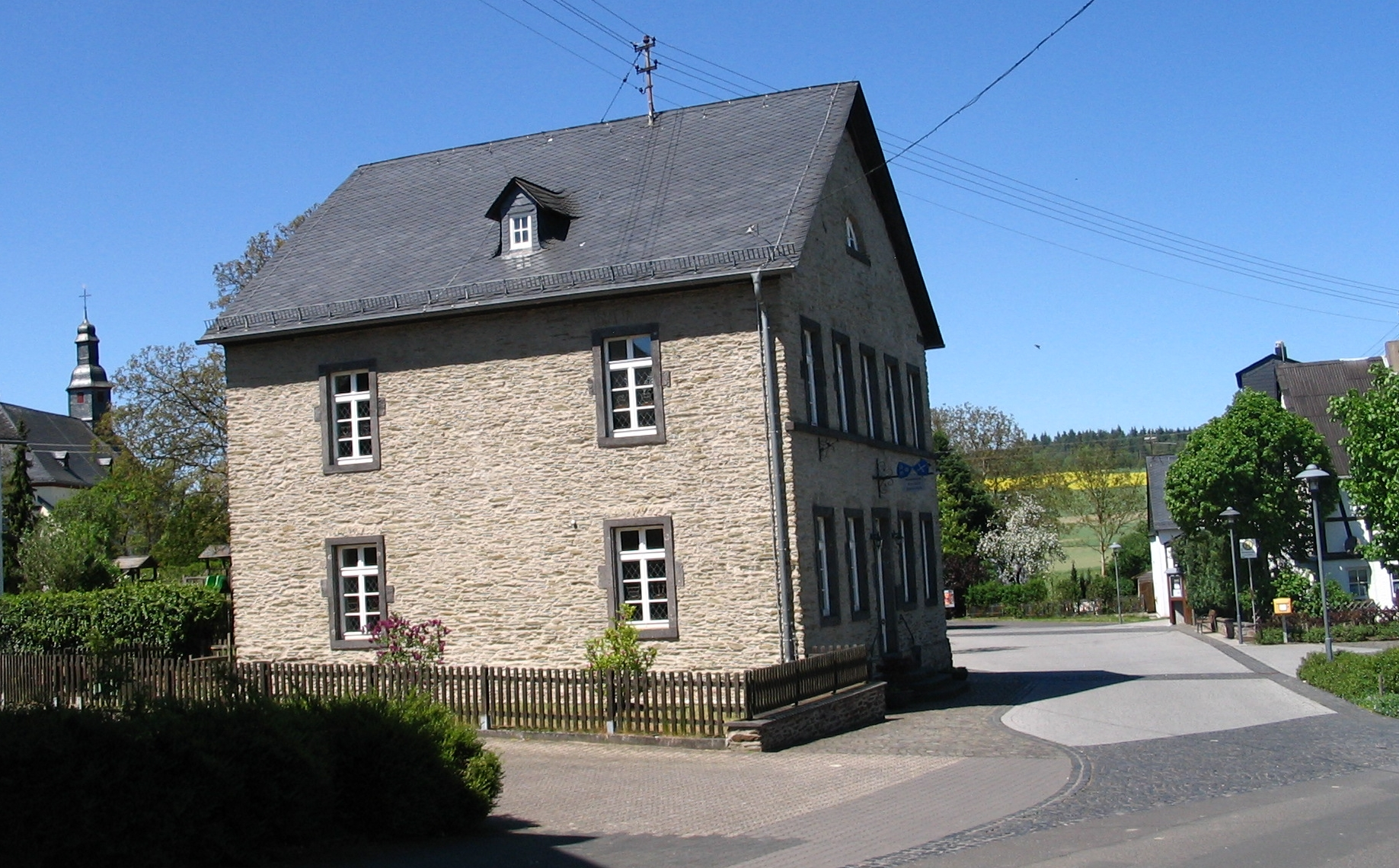
Dommershausen, An der Kirche 1: former rectory

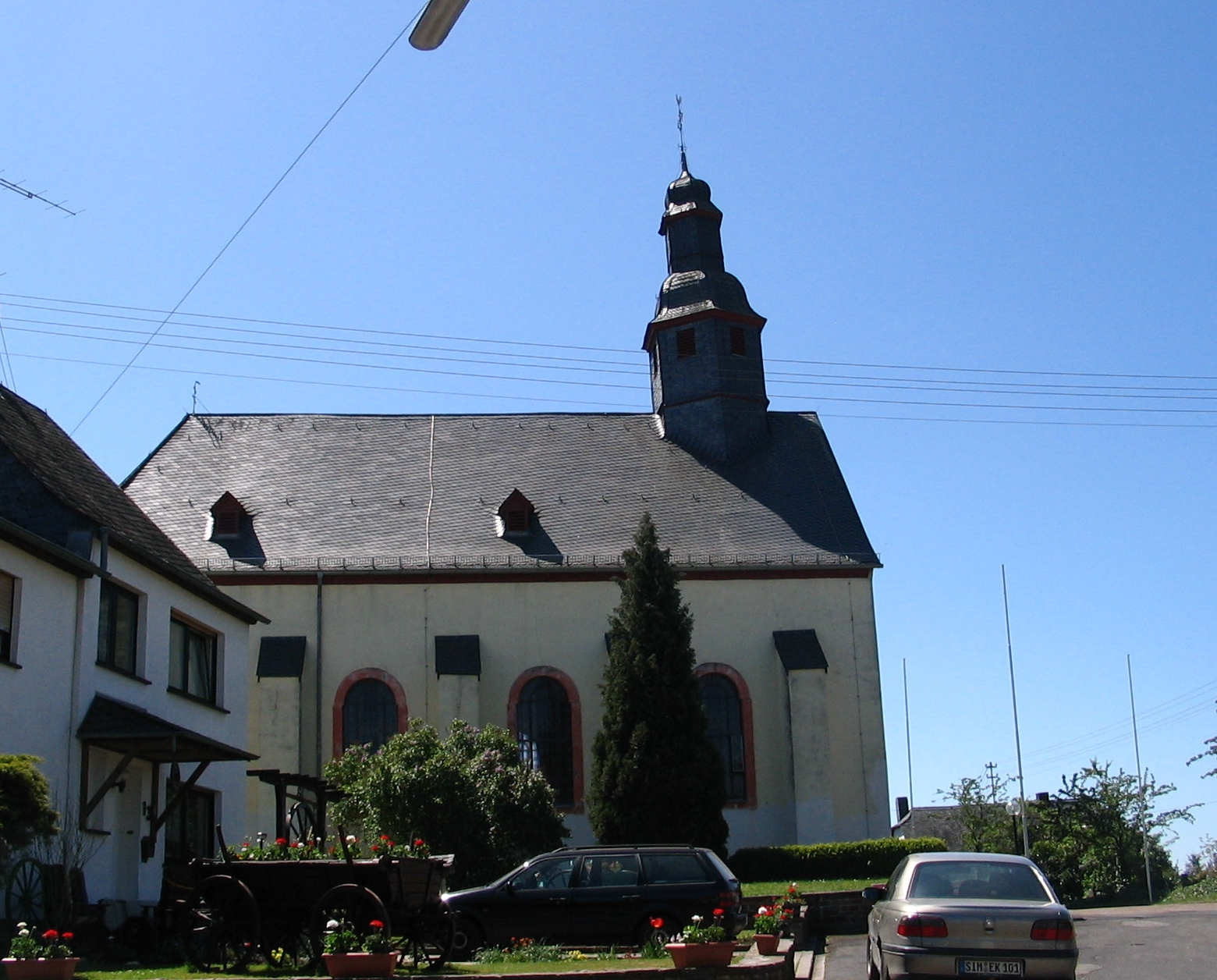
Dommershausen, An der Kirche 15: Saint Mark’s Catholic Parish Church

- Saint Mark’s Catholic Parish Church (Pfarrkirche St. Markus), An der Kirche 15 – aisleless church, marked 1759; graveyard: seven grave crosses, from among other years 1623, 1691, 1715, 1722, 1729; missionary cross, marked 1783 and 1860; priest’s tomb slab, marked 1737; whole complex of buildings with graveyard
- An der Kirche 1 – former rectory; slate quarrystone building, marked 1837
- Hauptstraße 23 – estate complex; timber-frame house, partly solid, late 17th or early 18th century, timber-frame barn, marked 1894; whole complex of buildings

==== Dorweiler ====
- Saint Willibrord’s and Saint Barbara’s Catholic Church (Kirche St. Willibrord und St. Barbara), An der Kapelle 9 – aisleless church, essentially Gothic, quire 1733
- Dorfstraße 16 – estate complex; timber-frame house, marked 1867, barn, timber-frame house, partly solid and slated, marked 1858; whole complex of buildings
- Graveyard – basalt graveyard cross, marked 1709 and 1881; basalt grave cross, marked 17(??); basalt grave cross, marked 1696; warriors’ memorial, basalt cross
- Gartenstraße 21 – timber-frame house, early 18th century, sandstone facing, 17th century
- Waldeck Castle ruin, northeast of the village – founding in first fourth of the 12th century, destroyed in the 1680s; two parts with bailey (within which a palace ruin, a chapel, a round tower, a bastion, etc.) and upper castle
- Wayside cross, on the road to Sabershausen – basalt, marked 1754

==== Eveshausen ====
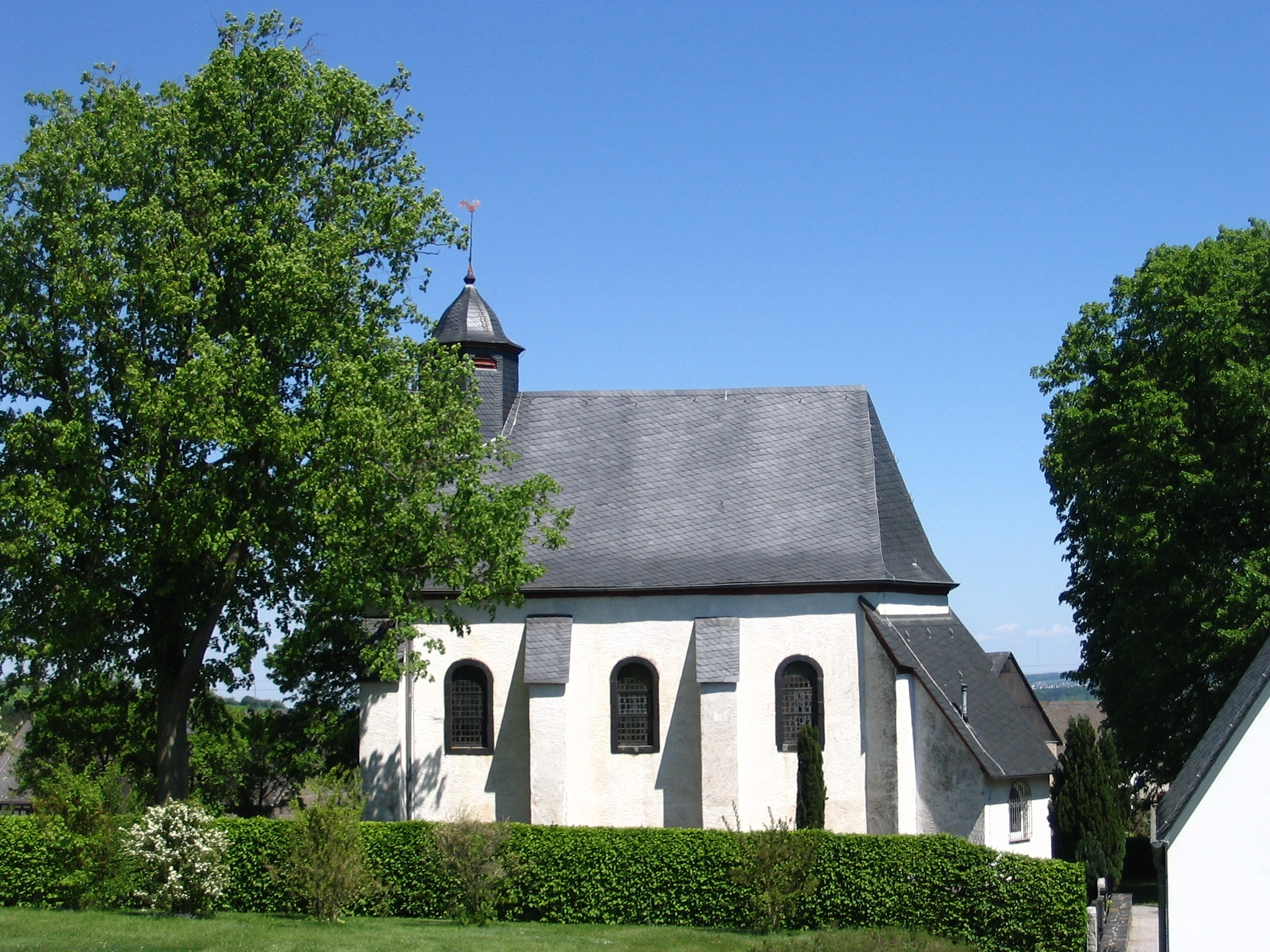
Eveshausen, Dorfstraße 28: Saint Vitus’s Church

- Dorfstraße 28 – Saint Vitus's Church (branch chapel: Filialkirche St. Vitus); aisleless church, marked 1763; six grave crosses, from among other years 1604, 1702, 1713, 1783; whole complex of buildings with graveyard
- Wayside cross, on the road to Dommerhausen – basalt, marked 1718

==== Sabershausen ====
- Saint John the Baptist’s Catholic Parish Church (Pfarrkirche St. Johannes der Täufer), Hauptstraße – brick aisleless church, 1867/1868; whole complex of buildings with old graveyard and parish garden
- Friedhofstraße – graveyard; basalt graveyard cross, marked 1843
- Near Hauptstraße 8 – basalt wayside cross, marked 1790; basalt tomb slab, marked 1790
- Hirtenstraße 2 – estate complex along the street; timber-frame building, partly solid and slated, 19th century, quarrystone barn; whole complex of buildings
- Kapellenstraße – Holy Cross Chapel (Heilig-Kreuz-Kapelle); aisleless church, partly timber-frame
- Stilweg 1 – former school; kind built by J. C. von Lassaulx; quarrystone building, marked 1844; quarrystone barn; whole complex of buildings
