= Forst (Hunsrück) =

- Municipality
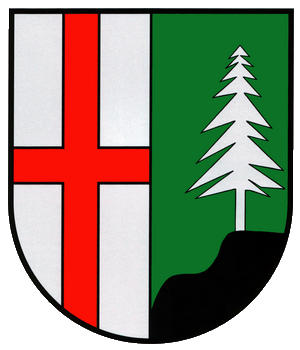
- Coat of arms

- Location of Forst within Cochem-Zell district
- Interactive map of Forst
- Location within Germany Location within Rhineland-Palatinate
- Coordinates: 50°04′54″N 07°19′01″E
- Country: Germany
- State: Rhineland-Palatinate
- District: Cochem-Zell
- Municipal assoc.: Zell (Mosel)

Government
  - Mayor (2019–24): Berthold Treins

Area
  - Total: 3.35 km^{2} (1.29 sq mi)
- Elevation: 357 m (1,171 ft)

Population (2025-12-31)
  - Total: 63
  - Density: 19/km^{2} (49/sq mi)
- Time zone: UTC+01:00 (CET)
  - Summer (DST): UTC+02:00 (CEST)
- Postal codes: 56858
- Dialling codes: 06545
- Vehicle registration: COC

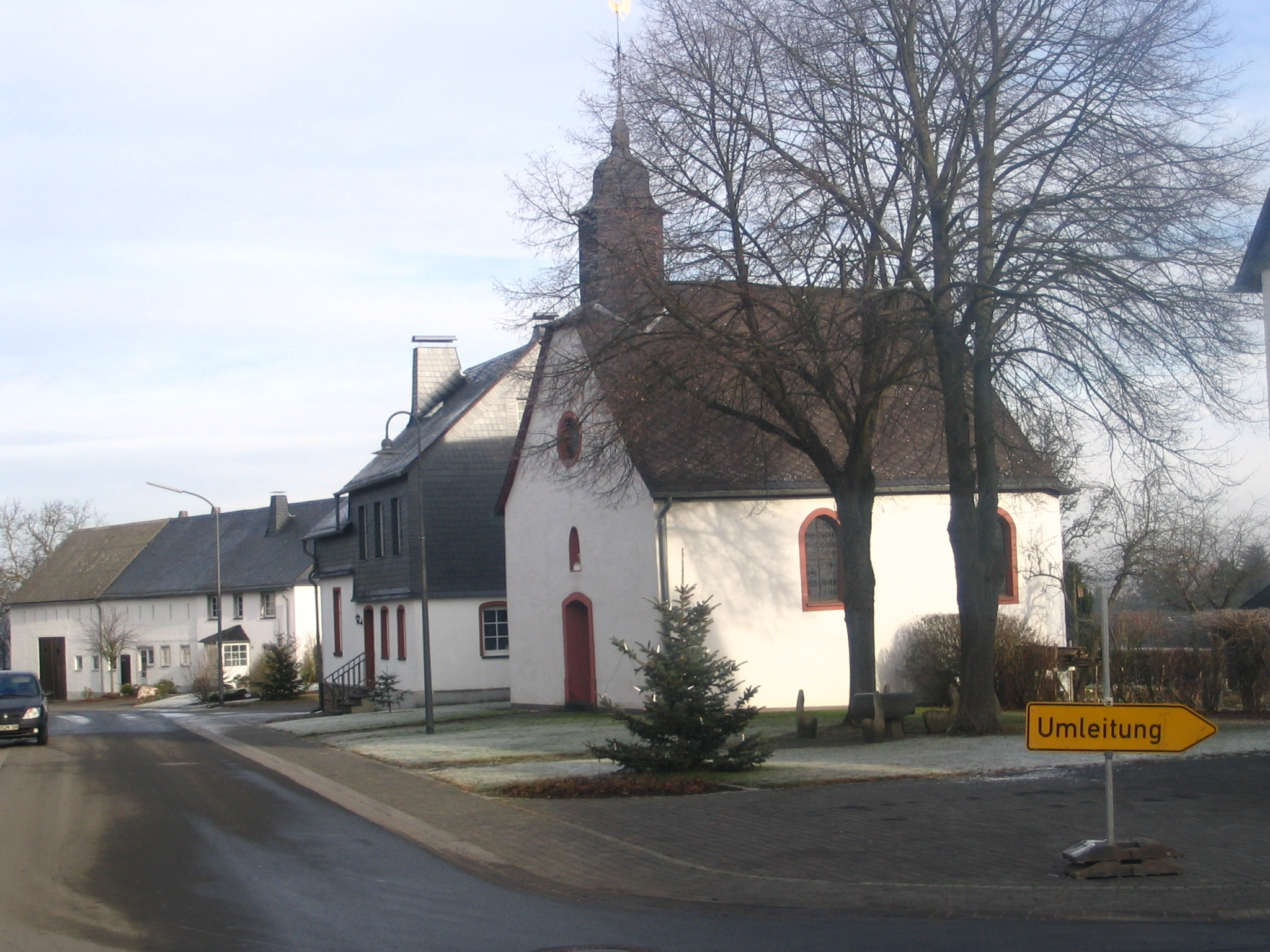
Chapel and main street

Forst (Hunsrück) (German pronunciation: [fɔʁst]) is an Ortsgemeinde – a municipality belonging to a Verbandsgemeinde, a kind of collective municipality – in the Cochem-Zell district in Rhineland-Palatinate, Germany. It belongs to the Verbandsgemeinde of Zell, whose seat is in the municipality of Zell an der Mosel. It is not to be confused with Forst (Eifel), which lies in the same district. The Forst that this article deals with has distinguished itself with the official tag “(Hunsrück)” since 1 June 1970.

== Geography ==
Forst, together with the municipalities of Altstrimmig, Liesenich and Mittelstrimmig, belongs to the so-called Strimmiger Berg and lies in the Hunsrück on a hill above the Mörsdorfer Bach (brook) not far from Mastershausen.

== History ==
The Strimmiger Berg was until 1781 part of the “Three-Lord Territory”. As in the Beltheim court, the landlordship was shared among the Electorate of Trier, the County of Sponheim and the House of Braunshorn (later Winneburg and Metternich). Beginning in 1794, Forst lay under French rule. In 1815 it was assigned to the Kingdom of Prussia at the Congress of Vienna. Since 1946, it has been part of the then newly founded state of Rhineland-Palatinate.

== Politics ==
=== Municipal council ===
The council is made up of 6 council members, who were elected by majority vote at the municipal election held on 7 June 2009, and the honorary mayor as chairman.

== Culture and sightseeing ==
=== Buildings ===
The following are listed buildings or sites in Rhineland-Palatinate’s Directory of Cultural Monuments:

- Saint John of Nepomuk’s and Saint Barbara’s Catholic Chapel (Kapelle St. Johannes Nepomuk und Barbara) – Baroque aisleless church, about 1747
- Oberdorf 10 – Quereinhaus (a combination residential and commercial house divided for these two purposes down the middle, perpendicularly to the street); timber-frame building, partly solid, from 1842

== Economy and infrastructure ==
The municipality is home to two agricultural businesses, one of which is a pig-fattening operation with 1,400 head. There is also a nationally known artists’ colony. Within Forst's limits is found one of Germany's tallest fir trees. The municipality's sewage is cleansed by a complex using a constructed wetland.
