= Lahr (Hunsrück) =

- Municipality
- Coat of arms

- Location of Lahr within Rhein-Hunsrück-Kreis district
- Interactive map of Lahr
- Location within Germany Location within Rhineland-Palatinate
- Coordinates: 50°07′34″N 7°21′59″E
- Country: Germany
- State: Rhineland-Palatinate
- District: Rhein-Hunsrück-Kreis
- Municipal assoc.: Kastellaun

Government
  - Mayor (2019–24): Jürgen Olbermann

Area
  - Total: 3.6 km^{2} (1.4 sq mi)
- Elevation: 345 m (1,132 ft)

Population (2025-12-31)
  - Total: 156
  - Density: 43/km^{2} (110/sq mi)
- Time zone: UTC+01:00 (CET)
  - Summer (DST): UTC+02:00 (CEST)
- Postal codes: 56288
- Dialling codes: 02672
- Vehicle registration: SIM
- Website: www.lahr-hunsrueck.de

Lahr (German pronunciation: [ˈlaːɐ̯]) in the Hunsrück is an Ortsgemeinde – a municipality belonging to a Verbandsgemeinde, a kind of collective municipality – in the Rhein-Hunsrück-Kreis district in Rhineland-Palatinate, Germany. It belongs to the Verbandsgemeinde of Kastellaun.

== Geography ==
=== Location ===
The municipality lies on a high plateau in the northern Hunsrück between the Lützbach valley to the east and the Dünnbach valley to the west.

=== Neighbouring municipalities ===
Lahr's neighbours are Zilshausen, 2 km away, Lieg, 3 km away and Mörsdorf, 4 km away.

== History ==
The Counts of Sponheim enfeoffed Kuno von Pyrmont with holdings and an estate in Lahr in 1438. The estate was under Pyrmont ownership in 1468. Friedrich von Pyrmont sold it in 1472 to Hanns von Lare. In 1790, the Counts of Hildesheim were listed as the landholders. Lahr belonged to the “three-lord” high court of Beltheim, which was shared by the Electorate of Trier, Pfalz-Zweibrücken (heirs of the Counts of Sponheim) and the lordship of Metternich-Winneburg-Beilstein (heirs of the Lords of Braunshorn). In 1773, Lahr belonged to the Amt of Baldeneck. In a 1780 partition agreement, Lahr passed together with Beltheim and other places to the Electorate of Trier and thereafter belonged to the Electoral-Trier Amt of Baldeneck and the Court of Beltheim.

In 1784, a chapel in Saint Oranna's honour was built on the spot formerly occupied by an older chapel. The congregation belonged to the parish of Lütz in the rural chapter of Kaimt-Zell and in the archdeaconry of Karden.

Beginning in 1794, Lahr lay under French rule. In 1815 it was assigned to the Kingdom of Prussia at the Congress of Vienna. Since 1946, it has been part of the then newly founded state of Rhineland-Palatinate. Before 1 July 2014, when it was assigned to the Rhein-Hunsrück-Kreis, it was part of the Cochem-Zell district.

== Politics ==
=== Municipal council ===
The council is made up of 6 council members, who were elected by majority vote at the municipal election held on 7 June 2009, and the honorary mayor as chairman.

=== Mayor ===
Lahr's mayor is Jürgen Olbermann.

=== Coat of arms ===
The German blazon reads: Unter silbernem Schildhaupt, darin ein durchgehendes rotes Kreuz, in Rot unten rechts ein silberner Pflug, oben links ein goldener Kreuzstab schrägrechts, belegt mit goldenem Ohr.

The municipality's arms might in English heraldic language be described thus: Gules in dexter base a plough argent and in chief sinister a cross-staff bendwise surmounted by a sinister ear Or, on a chief of the second a cross of the first.

The cross in the chief stands for the village's centuries-long association with the Electorate of Trier and later the Diocese of Trier. The plough refers to the time in the Early Middle Ages when the village arose as an agricultural community, and for agriculture itself, which is still undertaken in Lahr. The other charges, the cross-staff and the ear, are Saint Oranna's attributes, thus representing the church's patron saint. According to local lore, she has been revered in Lahr since the chapel was built in 1784. She is held to be the helper of those with earaches.

The arms were designed by A. Friderichs of Zell and have been borne since 30 November 1983.

== Culture and sightseeing ==
=== Leisure ===
The Hunsrück-Mosel-Radweg (“Hunsrück-Moselle Cycle Path”) runs through the village's outskirts, through the Luhnhofwald (forest). It is 30 km long and links the town of Kastellaun in the Hunsrück with Treis-Karden on the river Moselle. There are also well signposted hiking trails in the Lahr area.

=== Clubs and groups ===
Lahr has a volunteer fire brigade, a village community club, a chess club, the Petershausen Church Choir, a Nine-pin bowling club, the group Alter gemeinsam gestalten, a women's community and the youth centre.

=== Buildings ===
The following are listed buildings or sites in Rhineland-Palatinate’s Directory of Cultural Monuments:

- Saint Oranna’s Catholic Chapel (Orannenkapelle) – aisleless church, from 1784; basalt wayside cross, from 1714

The chapel was built in the middle of the village in 1784 in Saint Oranna’s honour on the spot formerly occupied by an older chapel. Particularly worth seeing are the mediaeval wooden altar and the many wooden and sandstone figures.

Also of note is the Bleichbrunnen (roughly “Bleaching Fountain”). In earlier days, housewives did their washing here and then spread the various pieces of laundry out on a nearby meadow to bleach.

=== Museums ===
- Ausstellungsraum (“Exhibition Room”): On display here are old tools and instruments.

== Economy and infrastructure ==
=== Education ===
The village's schoolchildren attend the primary school in Lieg. Secondary schools are to be found in Kastellaun, Münstermaifeld and Cochem.

== Gallery ==
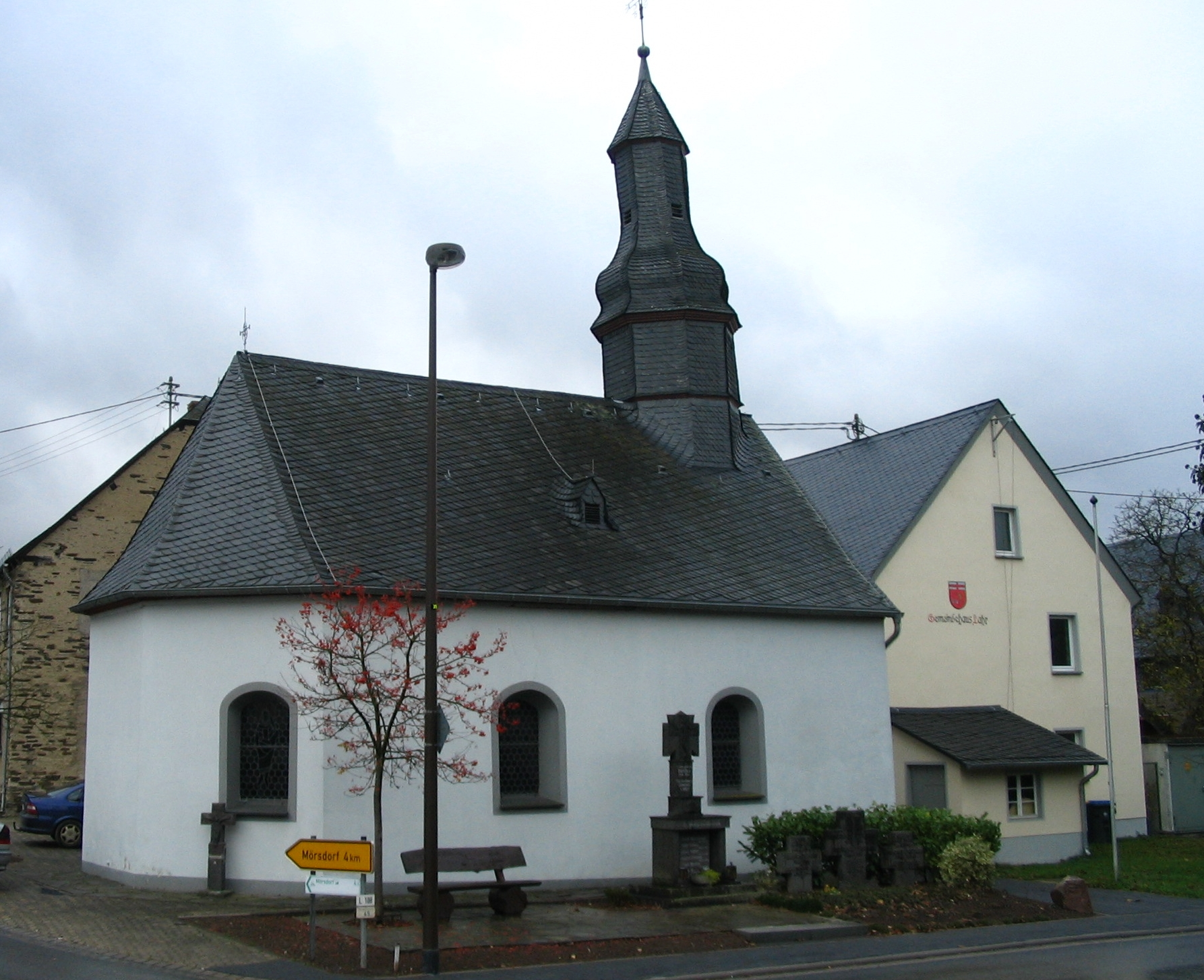
Oranna-Kapelle and community centre in the village centre
