= Foresta (surname) =

Foresta is a surname of Italian origin. Notable persons with that surname include:

- Don Foresta (born 1938), American vocalist
- Giovanni Foresta (born 1995), Italian footballer
- Michele Foresta (born 1961), Italian comedian, television presenter and actor
- Tony Foresta (born 1976), American research artist and theoretician in art
- Jean-Augustin de Foresta (1520–1588), French aristocrat, landowner and lawyer

== See also ==
- Foresta (disambiguation)
- Forest (surname)
- Forst (disambiguation)
