= Liesenich =

- Municipality
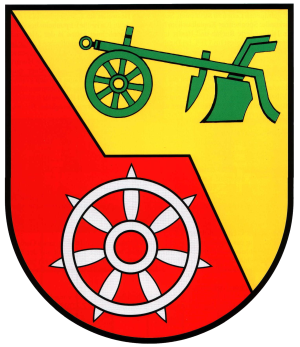
- Coat of arms

- Location of Liesenich within Cochem-Zell district
- Interactive map of Liesenich
- Location within Germany Location within Rhineland-Palatinate
- Coordinates: 50°5′6″N 7°16′3″E
- Country: Germany
- State: Rhineland-Palatinate
- District: Cochem-Zell
- Municipal assoc.: Zell (Mosel)

Government
  - Mayor (2019–24): Christian Fischer

Area
  - Total: 8.76 km^{2} (3.38 sq mi)
- Elevation: 380 m (1,250 ft)

Population (2025-12-31)
  - Total: 280
  - Density: 32/km^{2} (83/sq mi)
- Time zone: UTC+01:00 (CET)
  - Summer (DST): UTC+02:00 (CEST)
- Postal codes: 56858
- Dialling codes: 06545
- Vehicle registration: COC
- Website: www.liesenich.de

Liesenich is an Ortsgemeinde – a municipality belonging to a Verbandsgemeinde, a kind of collective municipality – in the Cochem-Zell district in Rhineland-Palatinate, Germany. It belongs to the Verbandsgemeinde of Zell, whose seat is in the municipality of Zell an der Mosel. Liesenich is a state-recognized recreational resort (Erholungsort).

== Geography ==
The municipality lies in the Hunsrück, and along with Altstrimmig, Forst and Mittelstrimmig is one of the villages that make up the Strimmiger Berg. With a population of roughly 350, Liesenich is considered one of the “somewhat smaller” places in the Strimmiger Berg.

== History ==
Various finds from Roman centres bear witness to early settlement in the area.

The Strimmiger Berg belonged until 1781 to the “three-lord territory”. As in the Beltheim court, the landlordship was shared among the Electorate of Trier, the County of Sponheim and the House of Braunshorn (later Winneburg and Metternich). Beginning in 1794, Liesenich lay under French rule. In 1814 it was assigned to the Kingdom of Prussia at the Congress of Vienna. Since 1946, it has been part of the then newly founded state of Rhineland-Palatinate.

== Politics ==
=== Municipal council ===
The council is made up of 8 council members, who were elected by majority vote at the municipal election held on 7 June 2009, and the honorary mayor as chairman.

=== Mayor ===
Liesenich's mayor is Christian Fischer.

=== Coat of arms ===
The German blazon reads: Schild von Rot und Gold schräggeteilt und quergebrochen. Oben ein grüner Pflug, unten in Rot ein siebenspeichiges, silbernes Richtrad.

The municipality’s arms might in English heraldic language be described thus: Per bend fracted per fess in the middle, Or a plough vert and gules a breaking wheel spoked of seven argent.

The Celtic placename Liesenich comes from the original form strymu, a word meaning “hanging” or “sloping”, hence the unusual partition in these arms. The charge in chief, the plough, refers to the way that the village arose, namely from an agricultural homestead. The seven-spoked wheel, the “breaking wheel” (called Richtrad in the German blazon – execution wheel) is Saint Catherine’s attribute, thus representing the municipality’s and the church’s patron saint.

The arms were designed by A. Friderichs of Zell.

== Culture and sightseeing ==
=== Buildings ===
The following are listed buildings or sites in Rhineland-Palatinate’s Directory of Cultural Monuments:

- Saint Catherine’s Catholic Chapel (Kapelle St. Katharina) – aisleless church, towards 1500, marked 1731 (renovation), west tower possibly Romanesque, Baroque cupola, marked 1731; grave cross, 1811; whole complex with graveyard
- Hauptstraße 12 – Quereinhaus (a combination residential and commercial house divided for these two purposes down the middle, perpendicularly to the street); timber-frame building, partly solid, late 19th century; whole complex with barn
- Hauptstraße 18 – former school; timber-frame building, late 19th century (marked 1838), expansion in the 1920s
- Hauptstraße 51 – timber-frame house, partly solid or slated, half-hipped roof, 17th century
- Hauptstraße 58 – Quereinhaus; timber-frame building, partly solid or slated, about 1900
