= Dünfus =

- Municipality
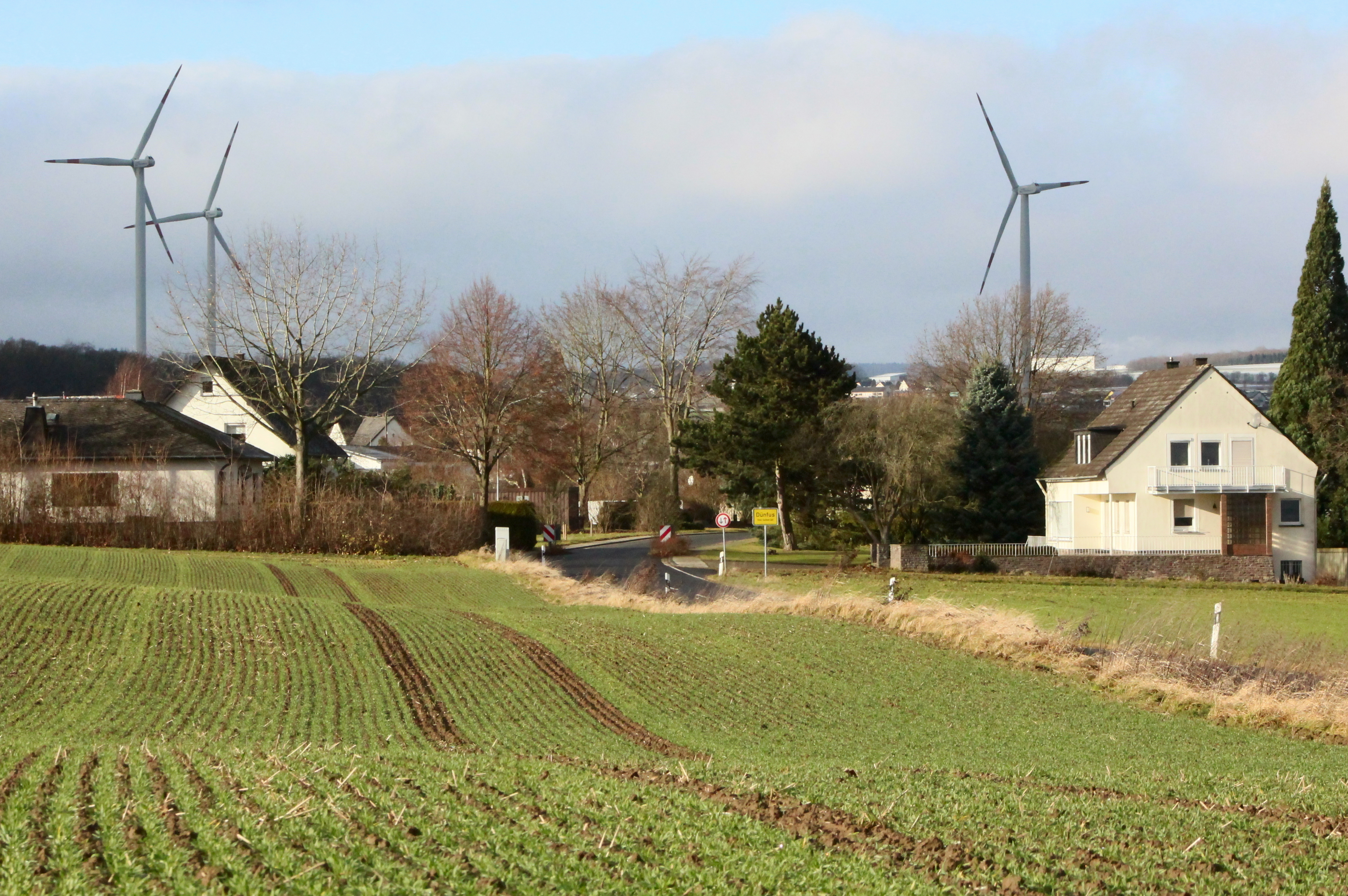

- Location of Dünfus within Cochem-Zell district
- Interactive map of Dünfus
- Location within Germany Location within Rhineland-Palatinate
- Coordinates: 50°13′14″N 7°14′0″E
- Country: Germany
- State: Rhineland-Palatinate
- District: Cochem-Zell
- Municipal assoc.: Kaisersesch

Government
  - Mayor (2019–24): Marcus Cortnum

Area
  - Total: 3.25 km^{2} (1.25 sq mi)
- Elevation: 315 m (1,033 ft)

Population (2025-12-31)
  - Total: 286
  - Density: 88.0/km^{2} (228/sq mi)
- Time zone: UTC+01:00 (CET)
  - Summer (DST): UTC+02:00 (CEST)
- Postal codes: 56754
- Dialling codes: 02672
- Vehicle registration: COC
- Website: www.duenfus.de

Dünfus is an Ortsgemeinde – a municipality belonging to a Verbandsgemeinde, a kind of collective municipality – in the Cochem-Zell district in Rhineland-Palatinate, Germany. It belongs to the Verbandsgemeinde of Kaisersesch.

== Geography ==
Dünfus lies in a hollow in the Eifel south of the Brohlbach, west of Brohl and Forst.

== History ==
In 1288, Dünfus had its first documentary mention with a reference to somebody named “Dizzeemann von Dunevuse”; the name is of Celtic origin and means “height on the brook”. Between 1686 and 1688, a chapel was built in Saint Bartholomew's honour. The overlordship was held by the Electorate of Trier until 1794 when the area was occupied by French Revolutionary troops. In 1815 Dünfus was assigned to the Kingdom of Prussia at the Congress of Vienna and was made part of the Prussian Bürgermeisterei (“Mayoralty”) of Karden. In 1933, Dünfus was grouped into the newly formed Amt of Karden-Treis in the Cochem district. Since 1946, it has been part of the then newly founded state of Rhineland-Palatinate.

== Politics ==
=== Municipal council ===
The council is made up of 8 council members, who were elected by majority vote at the municipal election held on 7 June 2009, and the honorary mayor as chairman.

=== Mayor ===
Dünfus's mayor is Marcus Cortnum.

=== Coat of arms ===
The German blazon reads: Schild geviert, Feld 1: in Gold eine schwarze Urne, Feld 2: in Grün eine silberne Rose, Feld 3: in Rot ein silberner Sparrenbalken, Feld 4: in Gold ein schwarzes breites Messer schräglinks.

The municipality's arms might in English heraldic language be described thus: Quarterly, first Or an urn sable, second vert a rose argent, third gules a bend dancetty of the fourth and fourth Or a flaying knife bendwise sinister of the second.

The ash urn is an archaeological artefact that was found in 1929 on the Häckelsberg, a local mountain, during excavation work. The rose refers to an estate held by the Rosenthal Monastery, which the monastery acquired in 1297 from Heinrich von Polch. The von Pyrmont noble family, too, held an estate in the village. Drawn from their arms is the charge in the third quarter, the bend dancetty (slanted zigzag stripe). The flaying knife is Saint Bartholomew's attribute, thus representing the church's patron saint.

The arms have been borne since 1985.

== Culture and sightseeing ==
=== Buildings ===
The following are listed buildings or sites in Rhineland-Palatinate’s Directory of Cultural Monuments:

- Saint Bartholomew's Catholic Church (branch church; Filialkirche St. Bartholomäus), Kirchstraße – aisleless church, about 1688; basalt wayside cross, from 1754
- Bergstraße 5 – timber-frame house, partly solid, half-hipped roof, 18th century, barn; whole complex of buildings
- Brachtendorfer Weg 2 – well; hipped roof, 18th or 19th century
- Brunnenstraße – well
- Kirchstraße (no number) – timber-frame house, partly solid, plastered, 18th century (?)
- On Landesstraße (State Road) 180 between Hambuch and Binningen – wayside chapel; octagonal plastered building, 19th century
