= Forst =

Forst may refer to:

== Communities ==
=== In Germany ===
- Forst (Aachen), in the district of Aachen
- Forst (Baden), in Baden-Württemberg
- Forst (Lausitz), in Brandenburg
- Forst (Unterfranken), part of Schonungen, Bavaria
- Forst, Altenkirchen, in the district of Altenkirchen, Rhineland-Palatinate
- Forst (Eifel), in the district Cochem-Zell, Rhineland-Palatinate
- Forst (Hunsrück), in the district Cochem-Zell, Rhineland-Palatinate
- Forst an der Weinstraße, in the district of Bad Dürkheim, Rhineland-Palatinate
- Forst, Lower Saxony, a district of Bevern, known for its residents Roedelius and Moebius in the 1970s

=== In Italy ===
- Forst (Foresta), a frazione in the comune of Algund (Lagundo) in South Tyrol, Italy

=== In Switzerland ===
- Forst, Switzerland, in the Canton of Bern

== Other uses ==
- Forst (surname), a German surname
- Forst (brewery), a brewing company from Forst (Foresta) in South Tyrol, Italy
- Detective Forst, a 2024 Polish television series
