= Binningen =

Binningen may refer to:

- Binningen, Switzerland
- Binningen, Rhineland-Palatinate
- Bining (German: Binningen), Lorraine, France
