= Foresta =

Foresta may refer to:

- Foresta (surname), Italian surname
- Foresta, California, unincorporated community in Mariposa County, California, within Yosemite National Park
- Foresta Fălticeni, former Romanian professional football club from Fălticeni, Suceava County, Romania
- Mount Foresta, multi-peak massif located in Wrangell–St. Elias National Park, in the Saint Elias Mountains of Alaska in the United States
- ACS Foresta Suceava, former professional football club from Romania, based in Suceava, Suceava County

== See also ==
- Forest (disambiguation)
- Forst (disambiguation)
