= Lütz =

- Municipality
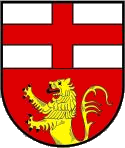
- Coat of arms

- Location of Lütz within Cochem-Zell district
- Interactive map of Lütz
- Location within Germany Location within Rhineland-Palatinate
- Coordinates: 50°09′41″N 7°21′38″E
- Country: Germany
- State: Rhineland-Palatinate
- District: Cochem-Zell
- Municipal assoc.: Cochem

Government
  - Mayor (2019–24): Simone Nick

Area
  - Total: 5.47 km^{2} (2.11 sq mi)
- Elevation: 140 m (460 ft)

Population (2025-12-31)
  - Total: 272
  - Density: 49.7/km^{2} (129/sq mi)
- Time zone: UTC+01:00 (CET)
  - Summer (DST): UTC+02:00 (CEST)
- Postal codes: 56290
- Dialling codes: 02672
- Vehicle registration: COC
- Website: www.luetz-hunsrueck.de

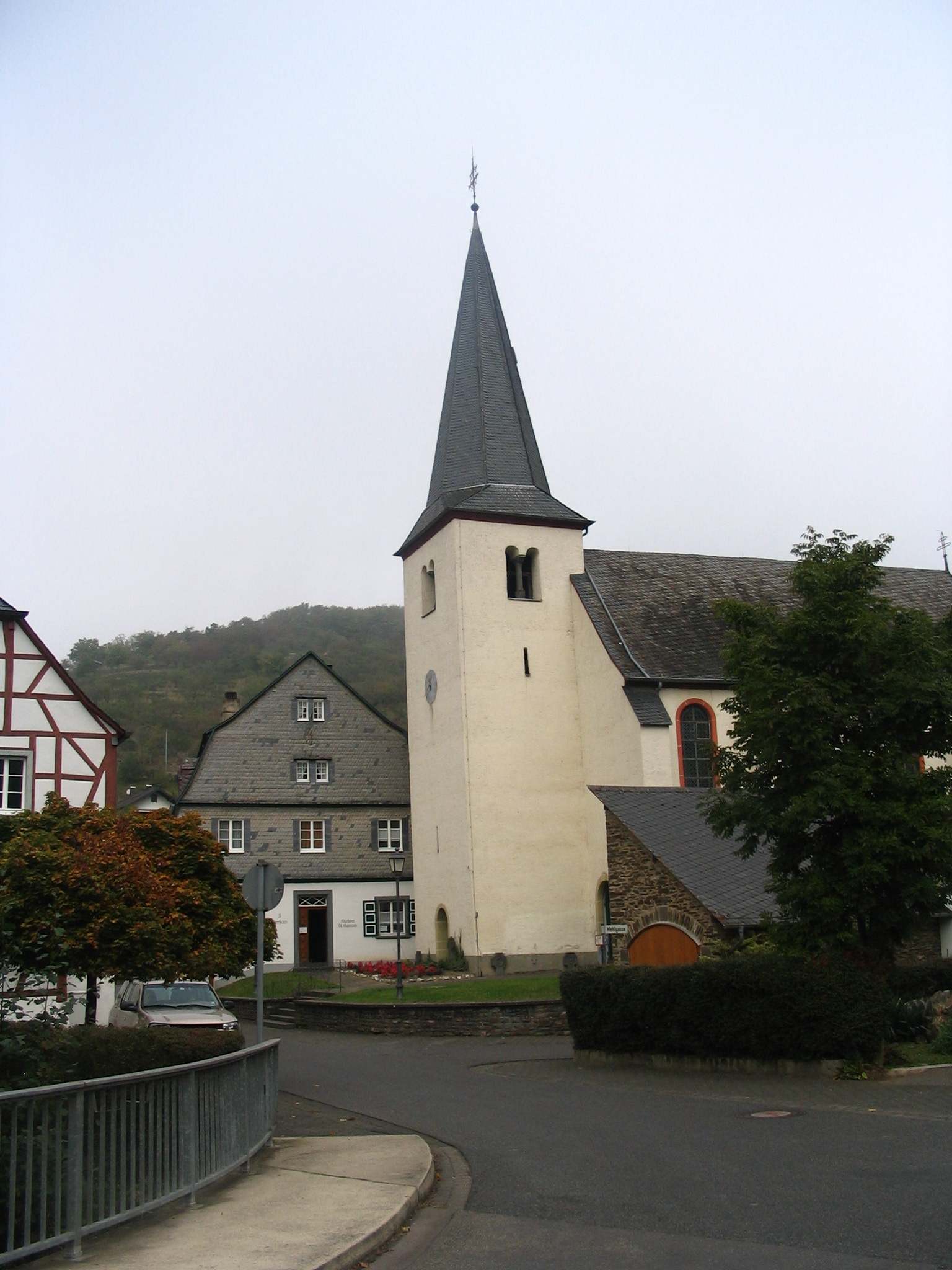
Timber-frame houses and the historic church characterize the village

Lütz is an Ortsgemeinde – a municipality belonging to a Verbandsgemeinde, a kind of collective municipality – in the Cochem-Zell district in Rhineland-Palatinate, Germany. It belongs to the Verbandsgemeinde of Cochem. Lütz is a state-recognized climatic spa (Luftkurort).

== Geography ==
The municipality lies in the northern Hunsrück in a side valley of the river Moselle (between the Moselle centres of Burgen and Treis-Karden), only a few kilometres from the river. Lütz lies in the Lützbach valley, which has almost no road links. The village distinguishes itself with a row of outstanding timber-frame houses.

== History ==
King Childebert II (570-595) donated to the Bishopric of Verdun holdings between the Lützbach (Luceia) and the Baybach (Beia). The estate has no further mention, but it was likely traded with the Abbey of Echternach, which crops up in the historical record as a landholder in the area in the Late Middle Ages.

On 1 January 912, Lütz had its first documentary mention when King Karl III donated his landholdings at Lutiaco to St. Maximin's Abbey. In a donation document from Heinrich von Trier about 1163, an estate on the "rivulus Luzze" is named. Also holding estates in Luzze in 1323 was the knight Heinrich von Eltz.

Saint Maximin's Church (Kirche St. Maximinus) was built in 1753.

Ecclesiastically, the parish of Lütz belonged to the rural chapter of Zell within the Archbishopric of Trier, although it did not lie within Electoral-Trier territory. The church was first mentioned in 1220 in the Archbishop's directory of holdings. Parochially united with Lütz were the villages of Lahr, Lieg and Zilshausen. In 1749, a fire destroyed part of the village, and Saint Maximin's Church (with the exception of the 12th-century Romanesque tower) and the town hall had to be newly built.

In the 14th century, Lütz lay under the lordship of the Lords of Eltz. Lütz was an Imperial Knightly holding and belonged until the annexation of the lands on the Rhine's left bank in the French Revolutionary Wars in 1794 to the Barons of Wiltberg. In 1815 Lütz was assigned to the Kingdom of Prussia at the Congress of Vienna. Since 1946, it has been part of the then newly founded state of Rhineland-Palatinate.

== Politics ==
=== Municipal council ===
The council is made up of 8 council members, who were elected by majority vote at the municipal election held on 7 June 2009, and the honorary mayor as chairman.

=== Mayor ===
Lütz's mayor is Simone Nick.

=== Coat of arms ===
The German blazon reads: Im geteilten Schild, oben in Silber ein rotes Balkenkreuz, unten in Rot ein schwarzbewehrter und -gezungter wachsender goldener Löwe.

The municipality's arms might in English heraldic language be described thus: In the divided shield, in the top in silver a red cross of a beam, below in red a gold-plated and black-growing growing lion.

The red cross refers to the municipality's former allegiance to the Archbishopric of Trier (but not the Electorate of Trier) and its continued status as part of the Diocese of Trier. As early as 1220, the parish of Lütz appeared in a directory of the archiepiscopal revenues. In 1515, patronage rights had found their way to the Archbishop of Trier. The charge in base, the "lion rampant" comes from arms formerly borne by the Lords of Eltz. Beginning in 1323, these lords held an estate and other holdings in Lütz. In 1521, Johann von Eltz was enfeoffed with the village's "administration of justice, lordly rights, revenues and levies". According to a 1656 Weistum, the Lords of Eltz held the high court jurisdiction in Lütz (a Weistum – cognate with English wisdom – was a legal pronouncement issued by men learned in law in the Middle Ages and early modern times).

The arms were designed by A. Friderichs of Zell and have been borne since 1 April 1987.

== Culture and sightseeing ==
=== Buildings ===
The following are listed buildings or sites in Rhineland-Palatinate's Directory of Cultural Monuments:

- Saint Maximin's Catholic Church (Kirche St. Maximin), Kirchplatz 5 – Baroque aisleless church, marked 1753, Romanesque west tower; outside cross, wayside cross, two grave crosses with tomb slabs; Gothic Revival graveyard cross, 19th century
- Jewish graveyard (monumental zone) – fenced area with 30 grave steles
- Herrengrabenstraße, graveyard – Gothic Revival graveyard cross, 19th century
- Hollstraße 2 – timber-frame house, plastered, 19th century
- Kirchplatz 3 – former rectory and former school; timber-frame building, partly solid, plastered and slated, mansard roof, 1739
- Kirchplatz 4 – old town hall; timber-frame building, partly solid, half-hipped roof, third fourth of the 18th century, oven
- Mehlgasse 4 – timber-frame house, partly solid, hipped mansard roof, 18th or 19th century; whole complex with quarrystone barn
- Mehlgasse 81 – timber-frame house, hipped mansard roof, 18th century
- Schnellbachstraße 1 – timber-frame house, partly solid, 18th century
- Schnellbachstraße 3, Mehlgasse 6 – solid building, partly with windows with Gothic soffit, marked 1551, timber-frame spire light possibly from the 17th century
- Schnellbachstraße 113 – Hakenhof, 19th century; one-floor timber-frame house, barn
- near the Gotteshäuser Hof – wayside chapel; quarrystone building, 19th century; grave cross
- north of Lütz – wayside chapel; small vaulted aisleless church, 19th century
- south of Lütz on the Lützbach – Bildstock; Gothic Revival Christ figure

=== Sport and leisure ===
The Hunsrück-Mosel-Radweg ("Hunsrück-Moselle Cycle Path") runs through the village. A hiking trail leads alongside the brook through the dale. A newly built educational path gives visitors knowledge about the slate mining that was formerly undertaken in the Lützbach valley. At the time, there were 11 mines with 19 galleries and also 5 trial galleries. Slate was mined here until 1953. The slate mine tailing heaps today offer rare animal and plant species a unique biotope.
