= Forst (Eifel) =

- Municipality
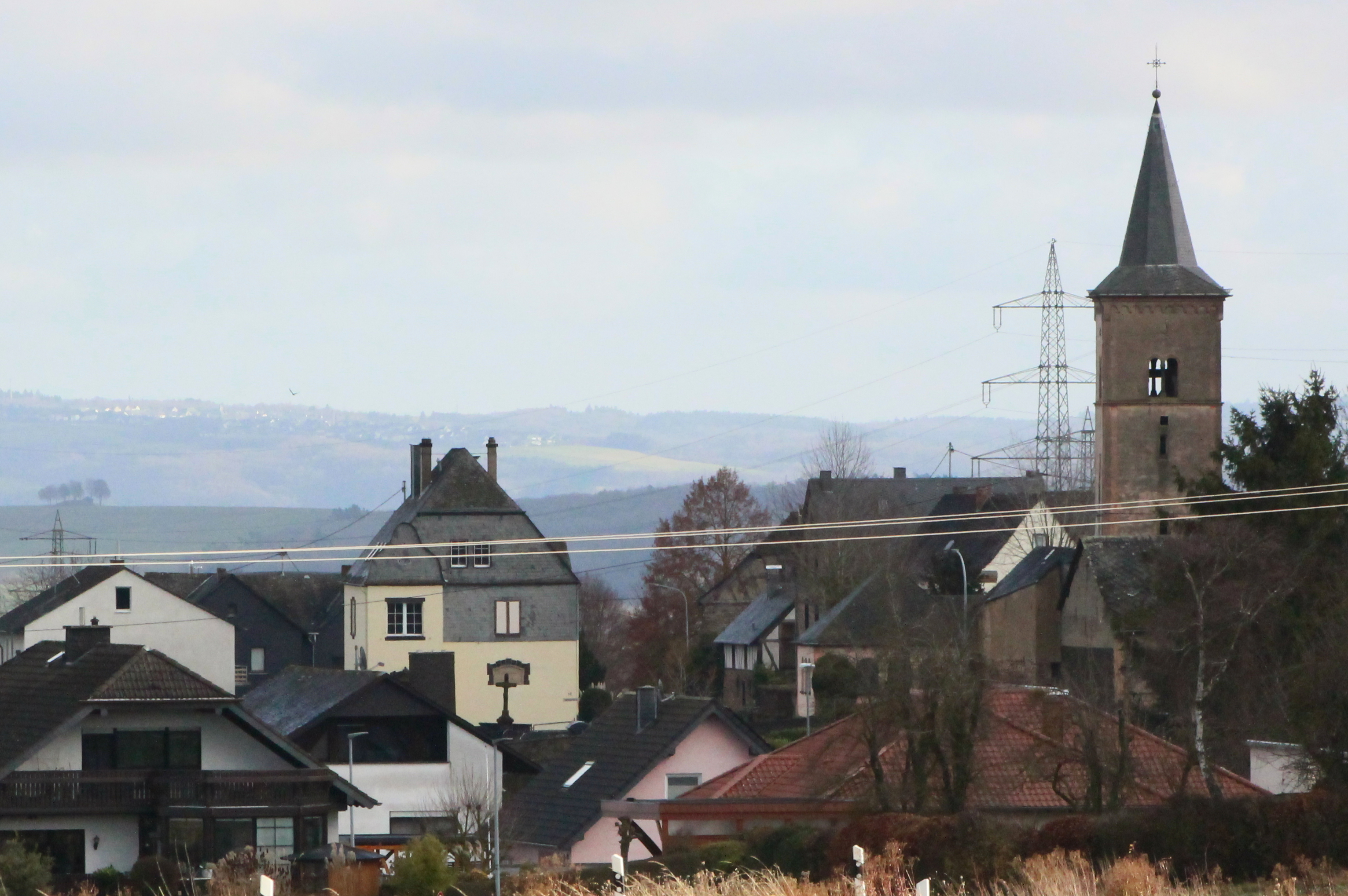

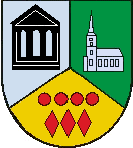
- Coat of arms

- Location of Forst within Cochem-Zell district
- Interactive map of Forst
- Location within Germany Location within Rhineland-Palatinate
- Coordinates: 50°13′04″N 7°15′03″E
- Country: Germany
- State: Rhineland-Palatinate
- District: Cochem-Zell
- Municipal assoc.: Kaisersesch
- Subdivisions: 3

Government
  - Mayor (2019–24): Nicole Fuhrmann

Area
  - Total: 3.93 km^{2} (1.52 sq mi)
- Elevation: 272 m (892 ft)

Population (2025-12-31)
  - Total: 390
  - Density: 99/km^{2} (260/sq mi)
- Time zone: UTC+01:00 (CET)
  - Summer (DST): UTC+02:00 (CEST)
- Postal codes: 56754
- Dialling codes: 02672
- Vehicle registration: COC
- Website: www.forst-eifel.de

Forst (Eifel) (German pronunciation: [fɔʁst]) is an Ortsgemeinde – a municipality belonging to a Verbandsgemeinde, a kind of collective municipality – in the Cochem-Zell district in Rhineland-Palatinate, Germany. It belongs to the Verbandsgemeinde of Kaisersesch. It is not to be confused with Forst (Hunsrück), which lies in the same district. The Forst that this article deals with has distinguished itself with the official tag “(Eifel)” since 1 June 1970.

== Geography ==
=== Location ===
The municipality lies in the Vordereifel (“Further Eifel”) between Treis-Karden and Kaisersesch.

=== Constituent communities ===
Forst's Ortsteile are Forst (main centre), Molzig and Pfaffenhausen.

== History ==
In two papal documents from 1178 and 1186, the village is named as Vosca and Vostra. Forst is the midpoint of the Forster Kirchspiel (parish), which was already a parochial and jurisdictional entity by the Middle Ages. The landholders about 1790 were Saint Castor's Foundation (Stift St. Kastor) in Karden, the Barons of Clodt, the Counts of Leyen, the Counts Waldbott von Bassenheim, the Rosenthal Monastery and the Franciscan convent in Karden. Beginning in 1794, Forst lay under French rule, and about 1802 came Secularization of all monastic holdings. In 1815 Forst was assigned to the Kingdom of Prussia at the Congress of Vienna. Since 1946, it has been part of the then newly founded state of Rhineland-Palatinate.

== Politics ==
=== Municipal council ===
The council is made up of 8 council members, who were elected by majority vote at the municipal election held on 7 June 2009, and the honorary mayor as chairman.

=== Mayor ===
Forst's mayor is Nicole Fuhrmann.

=== Coat of arms ===
The German blazon reads: Schild im Göpelschnitt geteilt. Vorne in Silber ein stilisierter schwarzer Tempel, hinten in Grün eine silberne Kirche, unten in Gold über drei roten Rauten vier rote Kugeln, jeweils balkenweise.

The municipality's arms might in English heraldic language be described thus: Per pall reversed, dexter argent a temple sable, sinister vert a church of the first, and in base Or four roundels in fess under which three lozenges in fess, all gules.

The partition into three fields is a reference to the centres of Forst, Molzig and Pfaffenhausen, which are all parts of the municipality of Forst (Eifel). The temple on the dexter (armsbearer's right, viewer's left) side refers to the Roman settlement whose remnants were found in the cadastral area known as Stockborn. The parish had nine estates and its midpoint was the old church, seen on the sinister (armsbearer's left, viewer's right) side, which in 1288 was named in Rudolf von Polch's will. The parish's 1587 seal shows, among other things, the arms borne by the Lords of Brunsperch-Brohl, now also borne as a charge in the base of Forst's arms. These lords long held the Pellenz court as a fief.

The arms have been borne since 1987.

== Culture and sightseeing ==
=== Buildings ===
The following are listed buildings or sites in Rhineland-Palatinate’s Directory of Cultural Monuments:

==== Forst (main centre) ====
- Binniger Straße – wayside chapel, 18th or 19th century
- Hauptstraße 7 – former school; building with half-hipped roof, partly plastered, Swiss chalet style, from 1912
- Hauptstraße 8 – so-called Fränkischer Hof; quarrystone building, from 1896; at the stable second-hand stone, from 1686; whole complex
- In der Hohl – old Saint Castor’s Catholic Parish Church (Pfarrkirche St. Kastor); Romanesque tower, upper floor from 1873; whole complex with graveyard; cross with warriors’ memorial, 1920s; wayside cross, 1711; basalt grave cross, 1598; basalt wayside cross with Crucifixion group, 1702 and 1846 (renovation)
- Pfaffenhausener Straße 25 – Baroque door
- On Kreisstraße (District Road) 23, going towards Binningen – grave cross, 18th century
- On Kreisstraße 28 – wayside chapel; plastered quarrystone building, 18th century
- On Kreisstraße 28, going towards Dünfus – basalt wayside cross, 18th or 19th century

==== Molzig ====
- Molzigerstraße: basalt wayside cross, from 1696

The outlying centre of Pfaffenhausen has no sites in the directory.
