= Altstrimmig =

- Municipality
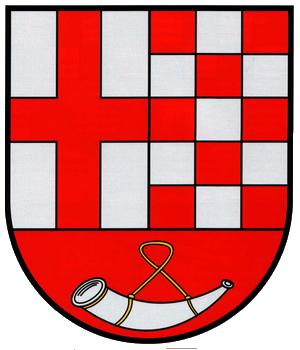
- Coat of arms

- Location of Altstrimmig within Cochem-Zell district
- Interactive map of Altstrimmig
- Location within Germany Location within Rhineland-Palatinate
- Coordinates: 50°5′36.100″N 7°17′32.27″E
- Country: Germany
- State: Rhineland-Palatinate
- District: Cochem-Zell
- Municipal assoc.: Zell (Mosel)

Government
  - Mayor (2019–24): Hans-Werner Peifer

Area
  - Total: 8.9 km^{2} (3.4 sq mi)
- Elevation: 345 m (1,132 ft)

Population (2025-12-31)
  - Total: 320
  - Density: 36/km^{2} (93/sq mi)
- Time zone: UTC+01:00 (CET)
  - Summer (DST): UTC+02:00 (CEST)
- Postal codes: 56858
- Dialling codes: 06545
- Vehicle registration: COC

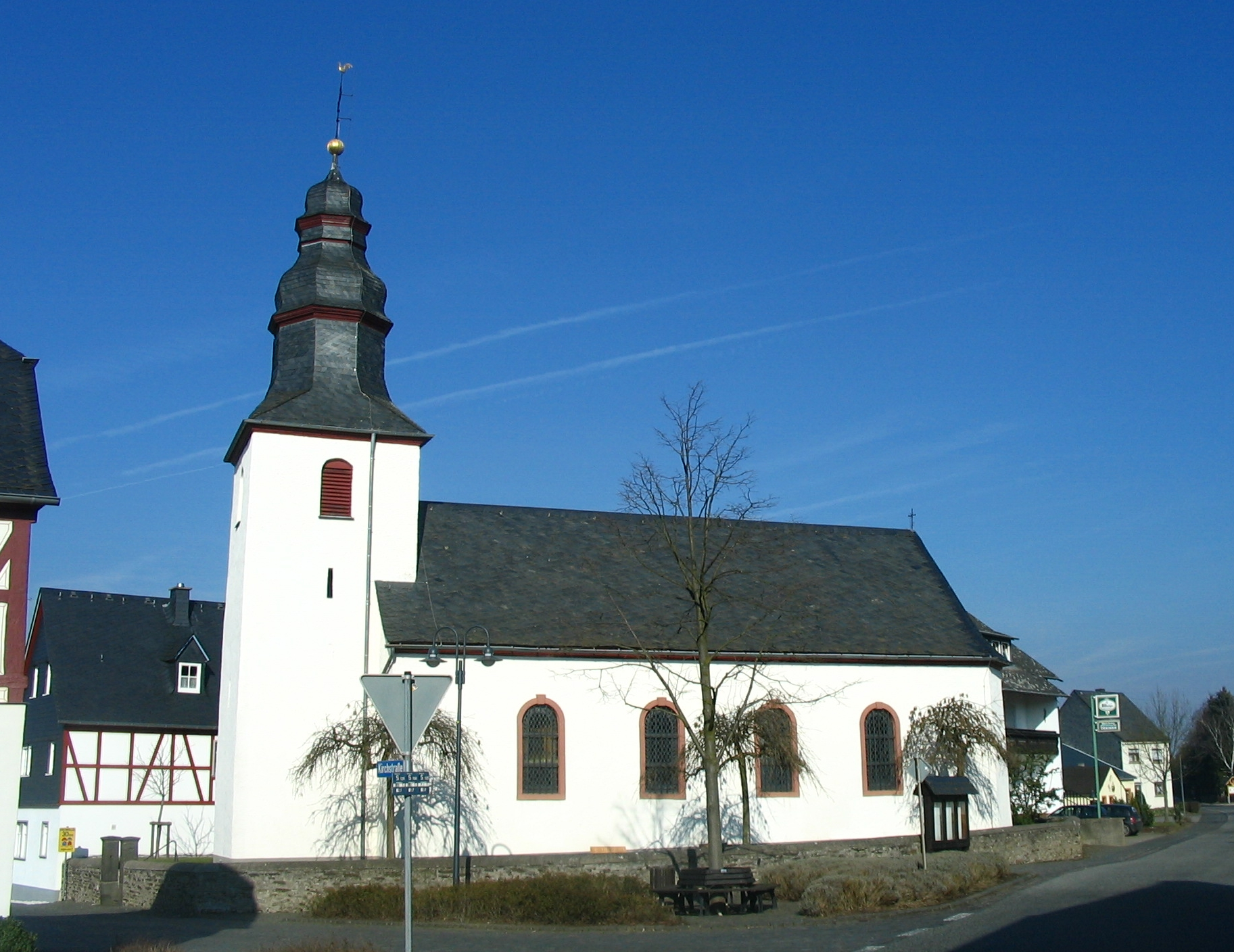
Church in Altstrimmig's village centre

Altstrimmig is an Ortsgemeinde – a municipality belonging to a Verbandsgemeinde, a kind of collective municipality – in the Cochem-Zell district in Rhineland-Palatinate, Germany. It belongs to the Verbandsgemeinde of Zell, whose seat is in the municipality of Zell an der Mosel.

== Geography ==
=== Location ===
The municipality lies together with the neighbouring municipality of Mittelstrimmig on a ridge in the northern Hunsrück, the Strimmiger Berg.

== History ==
In 1357, Altstrimmig had its first documentary mention. From 31 May 1358 comes a document with which Archbishop Bohemond II of Trier granted Gerhard von Ehrenberg a fief. The Strimmiger Berg was until 1781 part of the "Three-Lord Territory". As in the Beltheim court, the landlordship was shared among the Electorate of Trier, the County of Sponheim and the House of Braunshorn (later Winneburg and Metternich). Beginning in 1794, Altstrimmig lay under French rule. Beginning in 1798 Altstrimmig belonged to the Mairie ("Mayoralty") of Beilstein. In 1814 it was assigned to the Kingdom of Prussia at the Congress of Vienna.

=== 19th century ===
As was so throughout Germany, in Altstrimmig, too, there was a great deal of yearning to emigrate to America, for in the regions that are now Rhineland-Palatinate and Hesse, political dissatisfaction and a dearth of work prevailed. After the end of the French Revolution, there was growing hope among citizens of reaching a better social position.

On 26 May 1852, 85 persons (36 of whom were 14 and under, and 49 older than 14) left Altstrimmig for New York, where they landed on 13 June 1852. They made their new homes in Wisconsin in, among other places, Green Bay, Washington County, Sheboygan, Milwaukee, Germantown, Farmington, Cedarburg and Appleton.

A further 36 emigrants left the village between 1829 and 1890 for South and North America. In South America, settlers went to the areas around Porto Alegre, Santa Cruz do Sul and San José. There are still communities thriving in Novo Hamburgo, São Leopoldo and Rio Grande.

The travel costs amounting to 22,015 Thaler, 221 Silbergroschen and 46 Pfennig (for all emigrants from Mittelstrimmig, Altstrimmig, Liesenich, Grenderich and Senheim) were borne by the herein named municipalities. Altstrimmig's share of this was 3,156 Thaler.

=== Present ===
Since 1946, Altstrimmig has been part of the then newly founded state of Rhineland-Palatinate. Under the Verwaltungsvereinfachungsgesetz ("Administration Simplification Law") of 18 July 1970, with effect from 7 November 1970, the municipality was grouped into the Verbandsgemeinde of Zell

== Politics ==
=== Municipal council ===
The council is made up of 8 council members, who were elected by majority vote at the municipal election held on 7 June 2009, and the honorary mayor as chairman.

=== Mayor ===
Altstrimmig's mayor is Hans-Werner Peifer.

=== Coat of arms ===
The municipality's arms might be described thus: Per pale argent a cross gules and chequy of fifteen of the first and second, on a base of the second a bugle-horn of the first.

== Culture and sightseeing ==
=== Buildings ===
The so-called Alte Mühle ("Old Mill") was renovated and made functional once again by the local history and transport club.

The following are listed buildings or sites in Rhineland-Palatinate’s Directory of Cultural Monuments:

- Saint Anthony's Catholic Church (St. Antonius-Kirche), Kirchstraße 35 – aisleless church, mid-18th century.
- Kirchstraße, chapel – quarrystone, 19th century.
- Kirchstraße 24 – timber-frame house, partly solid, hipped mansard roof, 19th century.
- Kirchstraße 28 – house from an estate complex, timber-frame building, partly solid, half-hipped roof, 18th century.

=== Regular events ===
For several years the Antoniusmarkt (a market named after the municipality's patron saint, Anthony of Padua) has been held each year in late August.

== Economy and infrastructure ==
Altstrimmig has a community centre, a fairground, a children's playground and a barbecue pavilion with lavatories.

== Panorama ==
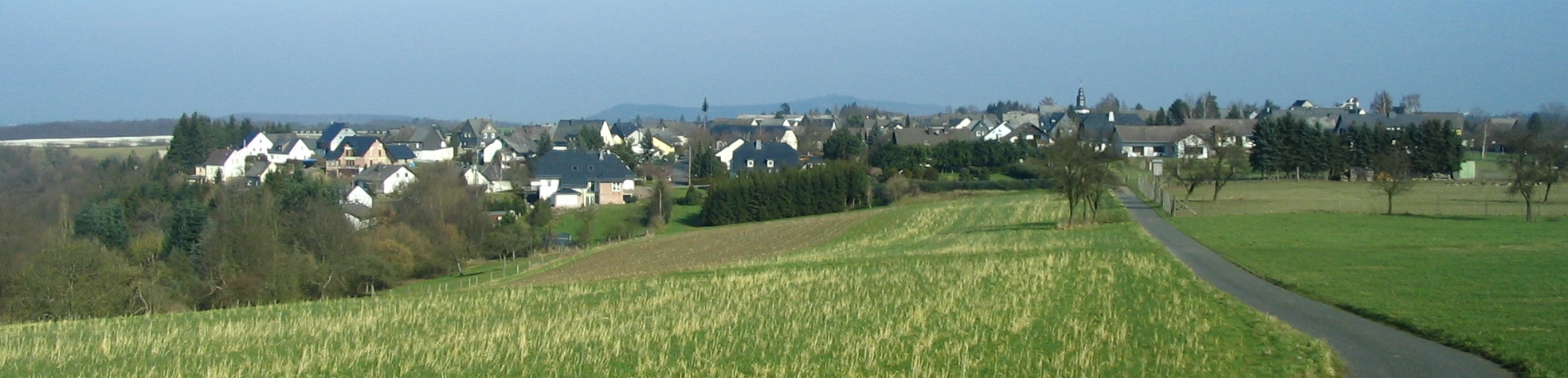
Altstrimmig (view from the west)
