= Mittelstrimmig =

- Municipality
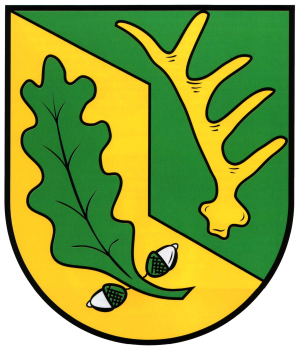
- Coat of arms

- Location of Mittelstrimmig within Cochem-Zell district
- Interactive map of Mittelstrimmig
- Location within Germany Location within Rhineland-Palatinate
- Coordinates: 50°05′24″N 7°16′59″E
- Country: Germany
- State: Rhineland-Palatinate
- District: Cochem-Zell
- Municipal assoc.: Zell (Mosel)

Government
  - Mayor (2019–24): Lothar Jakobs

Area
  - Total: 11.47 km^{2} (4.43 sq mi)
- Elevation: 350 m (1,150 ft)

Population (2025-12-31)
  - Total: 426
  - Density: 37.1/km^{2} (96.2/sq mi)
- Time zone: UTC+01:00 (CET)
  - Summer (DST): UTC+02:00 (CEST)
- Postal codes: 56858
- Dialling codes: 06545
- Vehicle registration: COC

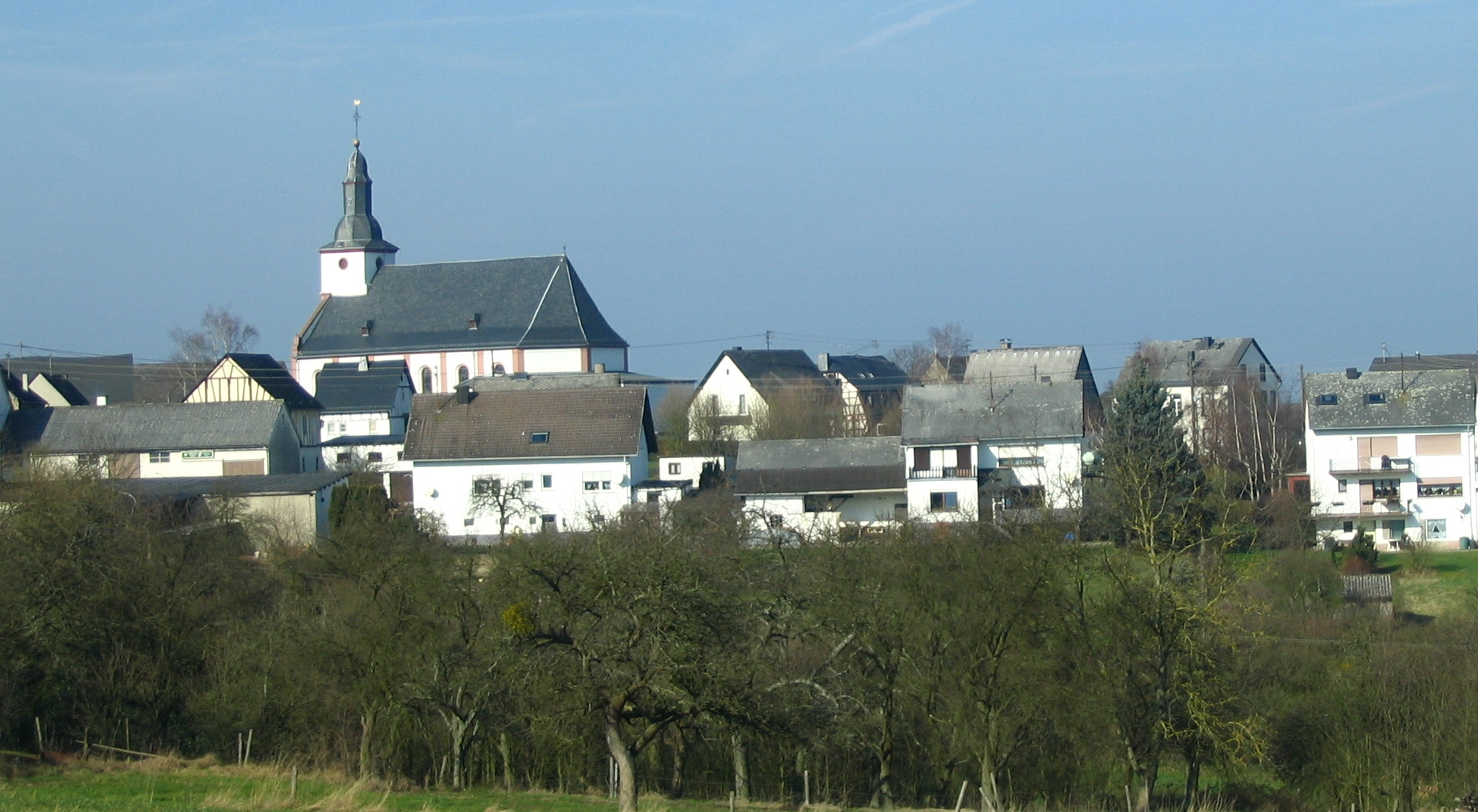
View from the south

Mittelstrimmig is an Ortsgemeinde – a municipality belonging to a Verbandsgemeinde, a kind of collective municipality – in the Cochem-Zell district in Rhineland-Palatinate, Germany. It belongs to the Verbandsgemeinde of Zell, whose seat is in the municipality of Zell an der Mosel.

== Geography ==
=== Location ===
Mittelstrimmig lies together with the neighbouring municipality of Altstrimmig on a high ridge in the northern Hunsrück roughly 30 km from Frankfurt-Hahn Airport.

Mittelstrimmig is the biggest village in the so-called Strimmiger Berg and, thanks to a great deal of woodlands, is among the Hunsrück's wealthiest municipalities.

=== Land use ===
Outside the built-up lands within the municipality, land use breaks down as follows:

- Forest: 716 ha
  - Municipal woodlands: 701.7 ha
  - Other woodlands held by official bodies: 0.4 ha
  - Small, private woodlots: 13.6 ha
- Agriculture: 337 ha
  - Cropland: 211.3 ha
  - Crop-grassland: 12.8 ha
  - Grassland: 102.2 ha
  - Meadow orchard: 0.6 ha
  - Grazing land: 9.6 ha
  - Horticultural land: 0.3 ha
  - Tree nurseries: 0.2 ha

The figures are from the Daun Land Survey and Cadastral Office (Vermessungs- und Katasteramt Daun), dated 2 August 2005.

== History ==
=== Roman times ===
Along today's Landesstraße 202 between Mittelstrimmig and Blankenrath, remnants of a Roman settlement, or vicus, were found. Later research brought to light that an important Roman highway once led through the area. The local school chronicle has this to say about it: “…it is a fact that in the district called Die Mauer (“The Wall”), the clear remnants of an establishment of great extent, destroyed by violence, can still be made out today...”

=== Middle Ages ===
The first documentary mention of the name Strimmig – shared by Mittelstrimmig, Altstrimmig and the Strimmiger Berg – is to be found in a document from Count Simon I of Sponheim-Kreuznach from the year 1259, in which Heinrich, Lord of Ehrenberg, settled the matter of the inheritance from the County of Sayn with Count Simon with regards to the Vogtei of Strimmig. Mittelstrimmig belonged in the Middle Ages to the “three-lord” courts. In Mittelstrimmig, the three lords were: the Electorate of Trier, Sponheim and Braunshorn (until 1367). In 1437, Johann von Sponheim, the last Count of the ruling house of Sponheim, died. The County passed unpartitioned – as a condominium – to Margrave Bernhard of Baden and Count Friedrich at Veldenz. To this also belonged the Sponheim share in the “three-lord” court, which was administered by either Kastellaun or Trarben. In 1444, after Count Friedrich's death, the County of Veldenz passed to his son-in-law, Stephen, Count Palatine of Simmern-Zweibrücken. Stephen passed it to his second son, Louis I, Count Palatine of Zweibrücken.

=== Early modern times ===
About 1637, the family Winneburg-Beilstein, the Braunshorns’ heirs, died out. The lordship was taken over by the family Metternich, but only years later, about 1652. About 1776, the greater County of Sponheim was split up, with the “three-lord” part passing to Palatine Zweibrücken. Under the treaties of 1780 and 1784, the “three-lord” territory was itself dismembered. The Lords of Winneburg-Beilstein, or rather their successors, came into possession of the Vogtei of Strimmig.

Beginning in 1794, Mittelstrimmig lay under French rule.

=== 19th century ===
In 1814 or 1815, Mittelstrimmig was assigned to the Kingdom of Prussia at the Congress of Vienna. Despite greater freedom of travel, begging and vagrancy remained punishable. The problem of those with no fixed address, without social safeguards or possibility of taking care of their own livelihoods also affected the villages on the Strimmiger Berg. About 1842, the Prussian government passed a law requiring every Prussian citizen to have a permanent domicile, and requiring every municipality to house any family that was willing to settle. Many members of Prussian society's homeless wanderers seized the opportunity. This led in the villages on the Strimmiger Berg to the establishment of what were called Ortsteile Klein-Frankreich (roughly “Little France Neighbourhoods”). The dwellers of these new neighbourhoods were ordinary municipal citizens, but the long-established villagers continued to exclude them socially.

Between 1817 and 1830, Mittelstrimmig, like the other municipalities, was self-administering. The 19th century was in Mittelstrimmig, as it was throughout Germany, a time of yearning to emigrate to the United States, for the region that now makes up Rhineland-Palatinate and Hesse was seething with political discontent at this time, and there was a dearth of gainful work. After the French Revolution had ended, hopes began to grow that the social situation would become better. This, however, did not happen.

On 26 May 1852, 151 persons (56 of whom were 14 or younger) left Mittelstrimmig for New York on the U.S. ship Henry Clay, landing there on 13 June of the same year. They made their new homes in Michigan and Wisconsin in, among other places, Green Bay, Washington County, Sheboygan, Milwaukee, Germantown, Farmington, Cedarburg and Appleton. Another wave of emigration followed in July of the very next year. This saw 39 persons leave, also bound for New York, with their route going by way of Cologne, Antwerp, Liverpool or Hamburg and Bremen. The rest of the emigrants – 54 persons – left Mittelstrimmig between 1829 and 1890 bound for North or South America. The parts of South America that some went to were the areas around Porto Alegre, Santa Cruz do Sul and San José. These communities can still be found today in Novo Hamburgo (called Neu Hamburg in German), São Leopoldo and Rio Grande. Thirty-one newspapers and more than 150 clubs were founded by the colonists.

The cost of the voyage was 22,015 Thaler, 221 Silbergroschen and 46 Pfennigs; for all emigrants from Mittelstrimmig, Altstrimmig, Liesenich, Grenderich and Senheim, the cost was covered by their respective municipalities. Mittelstrimmig had to pay 5,578 Thaler of this amount. For the 1852 travel costs alone, 308 Morgen (roughly 9.8 ha) of forest had to be felled, among other things.

=== First World War ===
To the people in the Hunsrück, the war's imminence was something that was unknown. Only in mid July 1914 did it become apparent that a military conflict of some kind lay just ahead. On 6 August, Kaiser Wilhelm II issued a decree. A few days later, soldiers from Mittelstrimmig were leaving their homeland. With Germany's defeat, the people in Mittelstrimmig saw the world that they had known fall apart. Not only was the monarchy gone, but the toll in blood had been quite high. Nine men from Mittelstrimmig had fallen “for Empire and Emperor”. When soldiers withdrew from the villages, they left behind weapons and ammunition. Civilians took these and used them for hunting. With the German soldiers gone, the villages on the Strimmiger Berg were occupied by the Americans, who were billeted in barns, stables, barrooms at inns and schools. Once Germany had been divided into occupation zones by the victorious powers, the Americans withdrew and the Rhineland, and along with it the Strimmiger Berg, once again fell under French rule.

In the early 1920s, many young men left the Strimmiger Berg to go to Cologne, where money could be earned in factories and coalpits. However, once the French and Belgians occupied the Ruhr area in 1923, they came back home. As was so throughout Germany, make-work measures were undertaken. Several roads were built on the Strimmiger Berg by means of the Ruhr impost. Owing to inflation, a 21-year-old worker earned up to 35,000 Marks each day. Now, in a reversal of the former trend, people from Cologne were coming to Strimmig to hoard, steal and trade. The farmers, though, were unwilling to yield up very much, given the money's meagre worth.

On this subject, one chronicle had this to say: “…if one gets any money, one must right away buy something with it … the market value changes several times daily. At this time, one pays for 1 American dollar 4 trillion Marks, for one French franc, 1 billion 1 hundred million, where before one would have paid 4.20 Marks and 80 Pfennigs respectively. …a 3½ pound loaf of bread costs 170 million, a pound of butter 1-2 trillion… Daily people come from the Moselle and offer sugar, brandy in trade… Bills are reckoned in fruit, as oats, barley and wheat are very much coveted.”

=== Second World War ===
The Second World War began on 1 September 1939. Already by 26 or 27 August, 9 men from Mittelstrimmig had to man the anti-aircraft gun battery (Flugabwehrstelle, or FLUWA) in the cadastral area known as Galgenflur. Up to 1942, roughly 75 men from Mittelstrimmig were called into the forces, 28 of whom fell in the war (in, among other places, Stalingrad); a further 17 are missing in action to this day. Mittelstrimmig and Forst were the only two villages that came through the war unscathed in any bombing or grenade attack. Only one aircraft ever crashed within Mittelstrimmig's limits, having been shot down by an RAF bomber. The Flak battery in Mittelstrimmig was meant to defend Koblenz against Allied air-raids. When the war reached Koblenz in 1943, people fled, seeking shelter in slate caves and shacks.

=== Recent times ===
Since 1946, Mittelstrimmig has been part of the then newly founded state of Rhineland-Palatinate. Until 1970, the municipality belonged to the Verbandsgemeinde of Senheim. However, after state administrative reform, it became part of the newly formed Verbandsgemeinde of Zell in the Cochem-Zell district.

=== Name origin ===
The name Strimmig, formerly Stremig or Stremich, is of Slavic-Celtic origin. Strymu means “hanging” or “sloping”, and is held to mean “on the slope”.

== Politics ==
=== Municipal council ===
The council is made up of 8 council members, who were elected by majority vote at the municipal election held on 7 June 2009, and the honorary mayor as chairman.

=== Mayor ===
Mittelstrimmig's mayor is Lothar Jakobs, and his deputies are Heiko Theisen and Thomas Egon.

=== Coat of arms ===
The German blazon reads: Das Wappen von Mittelstrimmig ist schräg geteilt. Von Gold und Grün senkrecht gebrochen. In Gold ist ein Eichenblatt mit 2 Eicheln in silberner Frucht. In Grün eine 5-endiges Hirschgeweih.

The municipality's arms might in English heraldic language be described thus: Per bend fracted per pale in the middle, Or an oakleaf bendwise slipped vert fructed of two argent and vert a stag's attire of five points bendwise of the first.

The oakleaf stands for the municipality's extensive forests, and the stag's antler for the wildlife.

== Culture and sightseeing ==
=== Buildings ===
The following are listed buildings or sites in Rhineland-Palatinate’s Directory of Cultural Monuments:

- Saint Philip’s and Saint James’s Catholic Church (Kirche St. Philippus und Jakobus), Schulstraße – three-naved Baroque hall church, 1766-1769, architect possibly Paul Stehling (or Stähling), Strasbourg, quire expansion 1959-1962; two tomb slabs, one Late Gothic, 1522, obviously used again in 1729; two grave crosses, 1811, 1819; whole complex with surrounding area
- Auf der Fenn 2 – Quereinhaus (a combination residential and commercial house divided for these two purposes down the middle, perpendicularly to the street); timber-frame building, partly solid, 18th century
- Schulstraße 11/13 – timber-frame house, no. 11 plastered, no. 13 partly slated, hipped mansard roof, 18th century
- At the Hannosiusmühle (mill) south of the village in the Mittelstrimmig forest – chapel, aisleless church, ridge turret, 19th century
- On Kreisstraße 43 going towards Liesenich – wayside chapel, inside: Baroque Crucifix, possibly from the 18th or 19th century
- Cast-iron wayside cross, 19th century

Although not a listed building, the Weißmühle (“White Mill”) is also to be found in Mittelstrimmig. Part of the film Der Schinderhannes – the title character's homecoming with his girlfriend Julchen Blasius to his father's house – was made here. Another mill in the municipality is the one mentioned above in connection with the chapel with the ridge turret, the Hannosiusmühle, which nowadays houses a clinic that treats addictions.

=== Clubs ===
Life in Mittelstrimmig is characterized, as in other villages, by its clubs. Almost all clubs have names containing the placename “Strimmig”. Among the regular events in Mittelstrimmig are the Maikirmes (“May Fair”), which is held on the second weekend in May. One event of national importance is the International Federation of Popular Sports (IVV) hike on the second or third weekend in September, which is attended by hiking enthusiasts from all over Rhineland-Palatinate, Hesse, Luxembourg, Belgium and the Netherlands.

=== Religion ===
==== Parish church ====
Saint Philip's and Saint James's Church (Kirche St. Philippus und Jakobus) was built between 1766 and 1769 and cost, according to a surviving request document sent to the then Prince-Archbishop-Elector of Trier, Johann Phillip von Walderdorf, 2,000 Reichsthaler. The first work to strengthen the church's structure was undertaken as early as 1777. Further work needed to be done in 1845, 1861, 1863, 1881 and 1883. Remodelling between 1959 and 1962 fundamentally altered the church, with the chancel and quire being completely changed.

==== Church bells ====
Mittelstrimmig's Bells
Number	Weight (kg)	Name	Inscription	Note
1	1250	Christusglocke	Rex Christe, impera super nos	D
2	750	Marienglocke	Maria, assumpta, pro nobis ora	F
3	500	Josefglocke	Sancte Josef, nobiscum labora	G
4	250	Apostelglocke	Sancti Apostoli, vocate apostolos	B

Mittelstrimmig managed to keep its church bells in the First World War while others were being seized in the war effort to be melted down. What they were spared in the Great War, however, they were not spared in the Second World War; in 1943, the Army High Command decided to take the bells for war requirements. In 1951, however, sacrifices by the parish made it possible for the church to obtain four new steel bells, listed in the table at right.

One of the old bells was actually saved from the Wehrmacht. It dates from 1373 and is now at the church in Altstrimmig.

==== Heiligenhäuschen ====
Mittelstrimmig is home to three Heiligenhäuschen – small, shrinelike structures, each consecrated to a saint or saints.

The Dietzen-Heiligenhäuschen between Mittelstrimmig and Liesenich was built in 1700 by the Schöffe (roughly “lay jurist”) Johann Dietzen. In 2003, it was completely renovated. The figures were stolen by a thief from Valwig, but were replaced.

The Schock-Heiligenhäuschen was built in the 18th century and stands on Landesstraße 202 between Mittelstrimmig and Blankenrath. A parallel path leads to the Galgenflur (roughly, “Gallows Field”). The Schock-Heiligenhäuschen was every condemned man's last stop on the way to the gallows.

There is a third Heiligenhäuschen in the cadastral area called Konnel.

== Economy and infrastructure ==
=== Education ===
In Mittelstrimmig are found the Kindergarten Strimmiger Berg and the Grundschule Strimmiger Berg (primary school), which are also attended by children from surrounding villages. Secondary schools are to be found in Blankenrath, Kastellaun, Zell and Cochem.
