= Fořt =

Fořt (feminine: Fořtová) is a Czech surname. It was created either from the word fořt (from German Förster), meaning 'forester', or as a transcription of the German surname Forst with the same etymology. Notable people with the surname include:

- Iveta Fořtová (born 1972), Czech cross-country skier
- Pavel Fořt (born 1983), Czech footballer
- Radovan Fořt (born 1965), Czech cyclist
- Stanislav Fořt (born 1977), Slovak politician

== See also ==
- Fort (surname)
