= Forst (surname) =

Forst is a German surname. It was derived from the Middle High German word forst ('forest') as a designation for a person living in a forest or near a forest, or as a designation for a person working in the forest. The name also appears in the Czech Republic (feminine: Forstová). Notable people with the surname include:

- Aaron Forst, American politician
- David Forst (born 1976), American baseball executive
- Donald Forst (1932–2014), American newspaper editor
- Edward Forst (born 1960), American businessman and administrator
- Grete Forst (1878–1942), Austrian opera singer
- Judith Forst (born 1943), Canadian opera singer
- Rainer Forst (born 1964), German philosopher
- Willi Forst (1903–1980), Austrian actor, screenwriter, film director and singer

== See also ==
- Fořt, a Czech surname
- Förster, a German surname
- Detective Forst, Polish TV series
