= Beltheim =

- Municipality
- Coat of arms

- Location of Beltheim within Rhein-Hunsrück-Kreis district
- Interactive map of Beltheim
- Location within Germany Location within Rhineland-Palatinate
- Coordinates: 50°6′28″N 7°27′45″E
- Country: Germany
- State: Rhineland-Palatinate
- District: Rhein-Hunsrück-Kreis
- Municipal assoc.: Kastellaun

Government
  - Mayor (2019–24): Uwe Hammes

Area
  - Total: 24.85 km^{2} (9.59 sq mi)
- Elevation: 440 m (1,440 ft)

Population (2025-12-31)
  - Total: 1,916
  - Density: 77.10/km^{2} (199.7/sq mi)
- Time zone: UTC+01:00 (CET)
  - Summer (DST): UTC+02:00 (CEST)
- Postal codes: 56290
- Dialling codes: 06762
- Vehicle registration: SIM
- Website: www.beltheim.de

Beltheim (German pronunciation: [ˈbɛlthaɪm]) is an Ortsgemeinde – a municipality belonging to a Verbandsgemeinde, a kind of collective municipality – in the Rhein-Hunsrück-Kreis (district) in Rhineland-Palatinate, Germany. It belongs to the Verbandsgemeinde of Kastellaun, whose seat is in the like-named town.

== Geography ==
=== Location ===
The municipality lies in the central Hunsrück. The municipality's main centre, also called Beltheim, is home to just under half its inhabitants and lies on a hilltop some 2 km north of the Hunsrückhöhenstraße (“Hunsrück Heights Road”, a scenic road across the Hunsrück built originally as a military road on Hermann Göring’s orders).

=== Constituent communities ===
Beltheim’s Ortsteile, besides the main, namesake centre, are Frankweiler, Heyweiler, Mannebach, Schnellbach and Sevenich.

== History ==
In 893, Beltheim had its first documentary mention in Prüm Abbey’s directory of holdings, the Prümer Urbar as Beltuom. Beltheim was the seat of the Beltheim court comprising the following places: Beltheim, Uhler, Mörsdorf, Lieg, Eveshausen, Dommershausen, Lahr, Cochem-Zell, Buch, Mörz, Zilshausen mit Petershäuser Hof, Sabershausen, Macken and Burgen. The court originally belonged to the Electorate of the Palatinate and the Pellenz Courts. In the 14th century, a half share in the court was held by the Electorate of Trier, while one fourth each was held in fief by the Lords of Braunshorn and the Lords of Waldeck. In 1366, the Waldecks’ fourth share in the court passed to the Counts of Sponheim. Beginning in 1794, Beltheim lay under French rule. In 1815 it was assigned to the Kingdom of Prussia at the Congress of Vienna. Since 1946, it has been part of the then newly founded state of Rhineland-Palatinate.

== Municipal area’s development ==
Today's municipality of Beltheim arose through a merger of the former, smaller Beltheim with the until then self-administering municipalities of Frankweiler, Heyweiler, Mannebach, Schnellbach and Sevenich on 17 March 1974.

== Politics ==
=== Municipal council ===
The council is made up of 6 council members, who were elected at the municipal election held on 7 June 2009, and the honorary mayor as chairman.

=== Mayor ===
Beltheim's mayor is Uwe Hammes.

Each of the Ortsteile is headed by an official bearing the title Ortsvorsteher. They are Kornelia Kremer (Beltheim), Willi Görgen (Frankweiler), Mike Schneider (Heyweiler), Wolfgang Wagner (Mannebach), Heidi Gerhard (Schnellbach) and Ewald Braun (Sevenich).

=== Coat of arms ===
The German blazon reads: In gespaltenem, hinten geteiltem Schild vorn in Silber ein durchgehendes rotes Kreuz, hinten und oben ungezählt geschacht von Rot und Silber, unten und hinten drei silberne Hörner (2:1) in Rot.

The municipality's arms might in English heraldic language be described thus: Per pale argent a cross gules, and per fess chequy of sixteen of the second and first and gules three bugle-horns of the first.

The red cross on silver on the dexter (armsbearer's right, viewer's left) side (Saint George's Cross) stands for the Electorate of Trier, while on the sinister (armsbearer's left, viewer's right) side, the “chequy” pattern in the same tinctures, stands for the comital family of Sponheim and the charge underneath that, the three bugles, also in the same tinctures, comes from the arms formerly borne by the Lords of Braunshorn.

== Culture and sightseeing ==
=== Buildings ===
The following are listed buildings or sites in Rhineland-Palatinate’s Directory of Cultural Monuments:

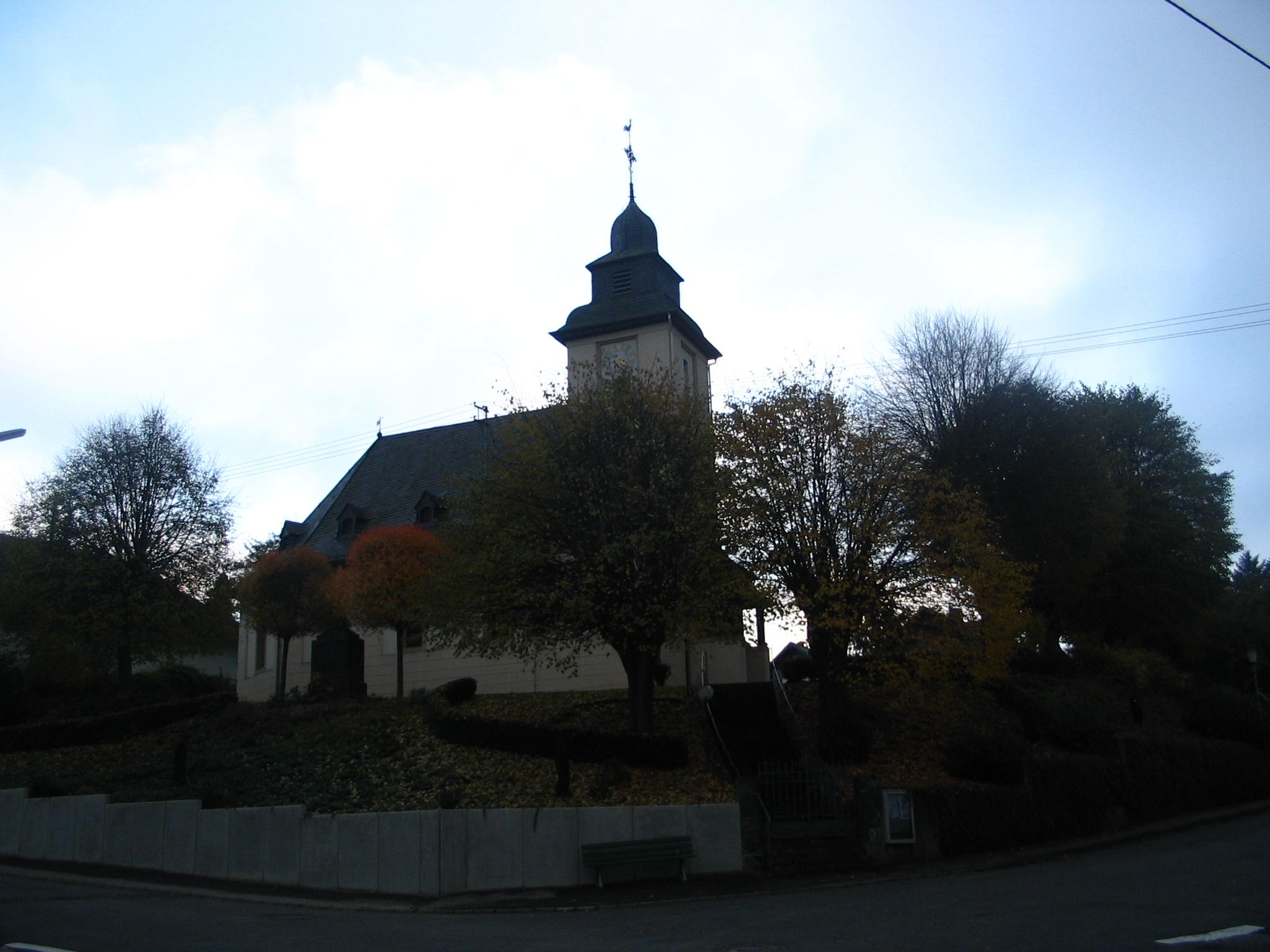
Heyweiler, Hauptstraße 17: Evangelical church

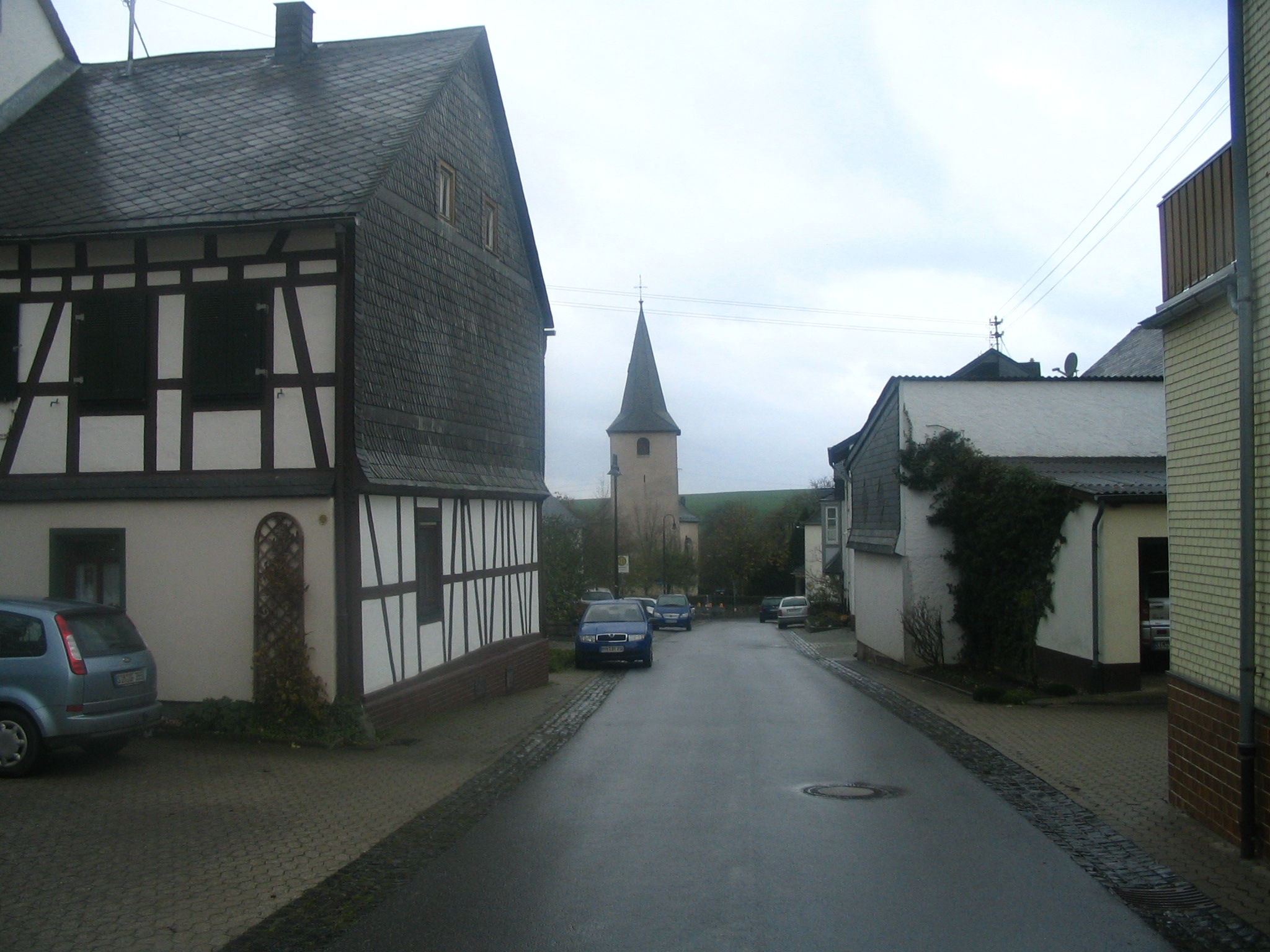
Mannebach, St.-Martin-Straße 26: Saint Martin’s Catholic Church

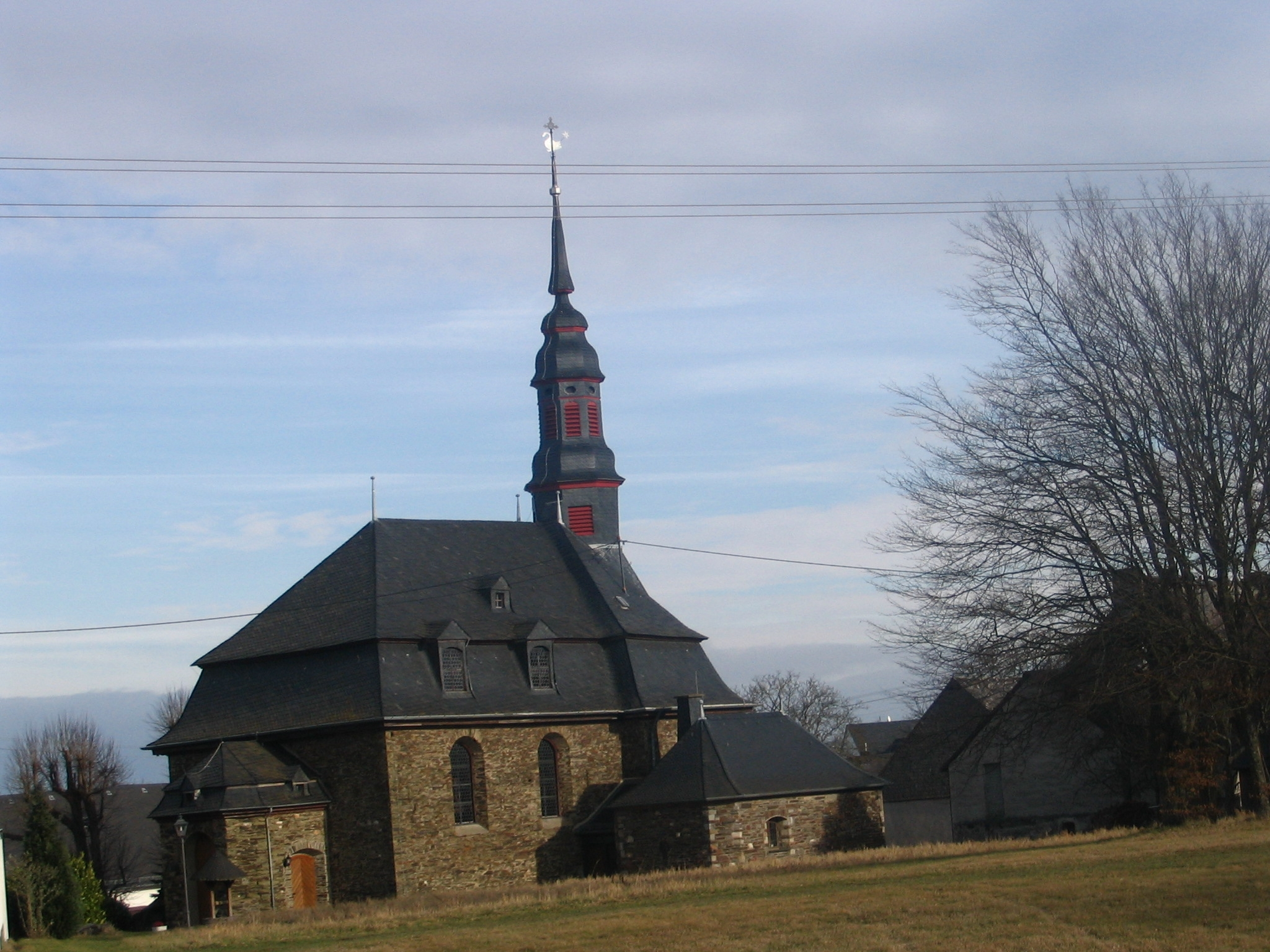
Sevenich, Lindenstraße 29: Saint Nicholas’s Catholic Church

==== Beltheim (main centre) ====
- Saint Goar’s Catholic Church (Kirche St. Goar), Kirchstraße 1 – plinth, wayside cross, quire essentially from the 17th century, aisleless church 1740, conversion and new building 1955-1957; in the rectory garden a Romanesque plinth, possibly from the 13th century; beside the church a basalt wayside cross, marked 1767
- Hauptstraße 19 – former seat of the “three-lord” court, later rectory; timber-frame house, partly solid, hipped mansard roof, about 1700; shell niche with Madonna, marked 1760; fountain; barn, 19th century; whole complex of buildings
- Hauptstraße 22 – estate complex along the street; timber-frame house, partly slated; timber-frame barn, earlier half of the 19th century
- Kirchstraße 11 – timber-frame house, partly solid, earlier half of the 18th century
- At Lehnenstraße 11 – timber-frame Quereinhaus (a combination residential and commercial house divided for these two purposes down the middle, perpendicularly to the street), partly solid and slated, 19th century, barn; whole complex of buildings
- Uhler Weg – quarrystone chapel; marked 1853
- Grave cross, on Landesstraße 215 going towards Frankweiler, near the graveyard – cast iron, from the Rheinböllen ironworks, late 19th century

==== Frankweiler ====
- Saint Maurice’s Catholic Parish Church (Pfarrkirche St. Mauritius), Rhein-Mosel-Straße 36 – Baroque aisleless church, 1724, marked 1756 (possibly a conversion), 1875 sacristy addition, 1906/1907 lengthened and remodelled; whole complex of buildings with graveyard
- (bei) Im Oberdorf 2 – chapel; plastered aisleless church, 19th century
- Im Vogelsang 1 – timber-frame house, partly solid, slated, earlier half of the 19th century; whole complex of buildings with barn
- Rhein-Mosel-Straße 15 – building with hipped mansard roof, partly timber-frame slated, first third of the 19th century
- Rhein-Mosel-Straße/corner of Zum Wiesentall – cast-iron fountain, from the Rheinböllen ironworks, latter half of the 19th century

==== Heyweiler ====
- Evangelical church, Hauptstraße 17 – Baroque Revival plastered building, early 20th century; basalt warriors’ memorial; whole complex of buildings with graveyard
- Hauptstraße 9 – L-shaped estate; timber-frame house, partly slated, commercial wing, earlier half of the 19th century; whole complex of buildings
- Hauptstraße 27 – L-shaped estate; timber-frame house, partly slated, barn, earlier half of the 19th century; whole complex of buildings
- At Hauptstraße 39 – Classicist door, marked 1820

==== Mannebach ====
- Saint Martin's Catholic Church (Kirche St. Martin), St.-Martin-Straße 26 – Baroque aisleless church, 1767–1770, quire tower essentially Romanesque; three grave crosses, 1807, 1814 and 1815; tomb slab; graveyard and church whole complex of buildings
- St. Martin-Straße 19 – former rectory, later a school; Late Baroque building with hipped mansard roof, marked 1780, garden; whole complex of buildings

==== Schnellbach ====
- Kapellenweg – quarrystone Heiligenhäuschen (a small, shrinelike structure consecrated to a saint or saints); early 19th century

==== Sevenich ====
- Saint Nicholas’s Catholic Church (Kirche St. Nikolaus), Lindenstraße 29 – aisleless church, 1723–1725, vestibule marked 1923, sacristy 1949; three grave crosses, 1783, 18th and 19th century; whole complex of buildings with graveyard
- Lindenstraße – graveyard; basalt graveyard cross, marked 1844
- Lindenstraße 28 – L-shaped estate; timber-frame house, partly slated, earlier half of the 19th century, timber-frame barn; whole complex of buildings
- Lindenstraße 34 – estate complex along the street; timber-frame house, partly slated, half-hipped roof, 18th century, timber-frame barn; whole complex of buildings
- Grave crosses on Kreisstraße 34, south of the village – two cast-iron crosses from the Rheinböllen ironworks, latter half of the 19th century
- Passion Chapel (Passionskapelle) on Kreisstraße 34, south of the village – small building with hipped roof, marked 1725; wayside cross

== Famous people ==
Josef Lippert (b. 17 January 1888; d. 8 February 1963) was a pedlar known throughout the Vorderhunsrück (“Fore-Hunsrück”), but he was from Beltheim. He always wore several jackets, buttoning or unbuttoning them according to season. He would refer to the weather with such remarks as “Hout es et wirra ane Jacke källa woar !” (“It’s got another jacket colder today!”). He was known to everyone as der Beldemer Lippert (Beldemer being a local form of Beltheimer).

The best known story about him stems from a “business trip” that he made to Berlin in the time of the Third Reich. It is said that, while hawking his stock of herring, he called out on the street “Hering, so fett wie de Göring !” (“Herring, as fat as Göring!”), for which he was carted off to prison for eight days. After he was released, he went straight back to his herring hawking, calling out “Hering, so fett wie die vorig Woch !” (“Herring, as fat as last week!”).

This story is likely apocryphal, as the same or similar stories are told about fish sellers in Ahlen and Koblenz, among others.

=== Further reading (Josef Lippert) ===
- Ewald Dietrich: Der Hausierer vom Hunsrück. Aus dem Leben des Josef Lippert. Simmern 1988 ISBN 3-922929-72-9
- Ortsgemeinde Beltheim (Hg.): Beltheim im Wandel der Zeit 893–1993. Aus der Geschichte eines Hunsrückdorfes; Beltheim 1993
- "Hering, so dick wie de Göring", Zeitungsartikel (HunsrückerZeitung?) vom Mittwoch, 20. Februar 1963
