= Zilshausen =

- Municipality
- Coat of arms

- Location of Zilshausen within Rhein-Hunsrück-Kreis district
- Interactive map of Zilshausen
- Location within Germany Location within Rhineland-Palatinate
- Coordinates: 50°6′47.29″N 7°22′59.91″E
- Country: Germany
- State: Rhineland-Palatinate
- District: Rhein-Hunsrück-Kreis
- Municipal assoc.: Kastellaun

Government
  - Mayor (2019–24): Markus von Ostrowski

Area
  - Total: 6.63 km^{2} (2.56 sq mi)
- Elevation: 360 m (1,180 ft)

Population (2025-12-31)
  - Total: 266
  - Density: 40.1/km^{2} (104/sq mi)
- Time zone: UTC+01:00 (CET)
  - Summer (DST): UTC+02:00 (CEST)
- Postal codes: 56288
- Dialling codes: 06762
- Vehicle registration: SIM
- Website: www.zilshausen.de

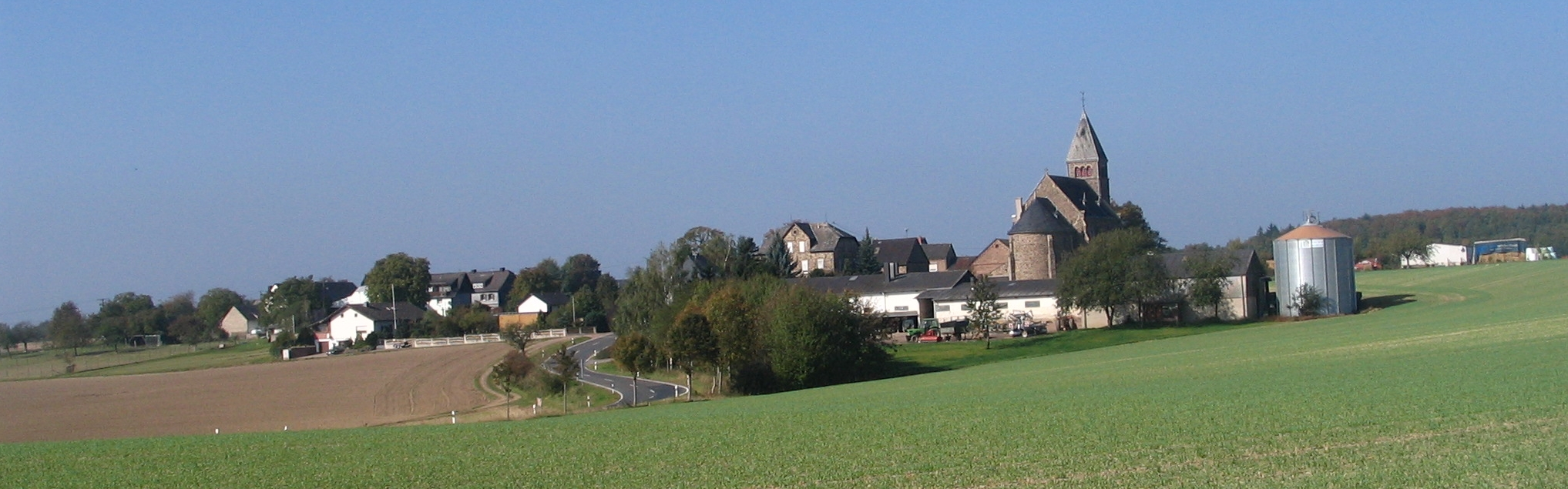
Petershäuser Hof

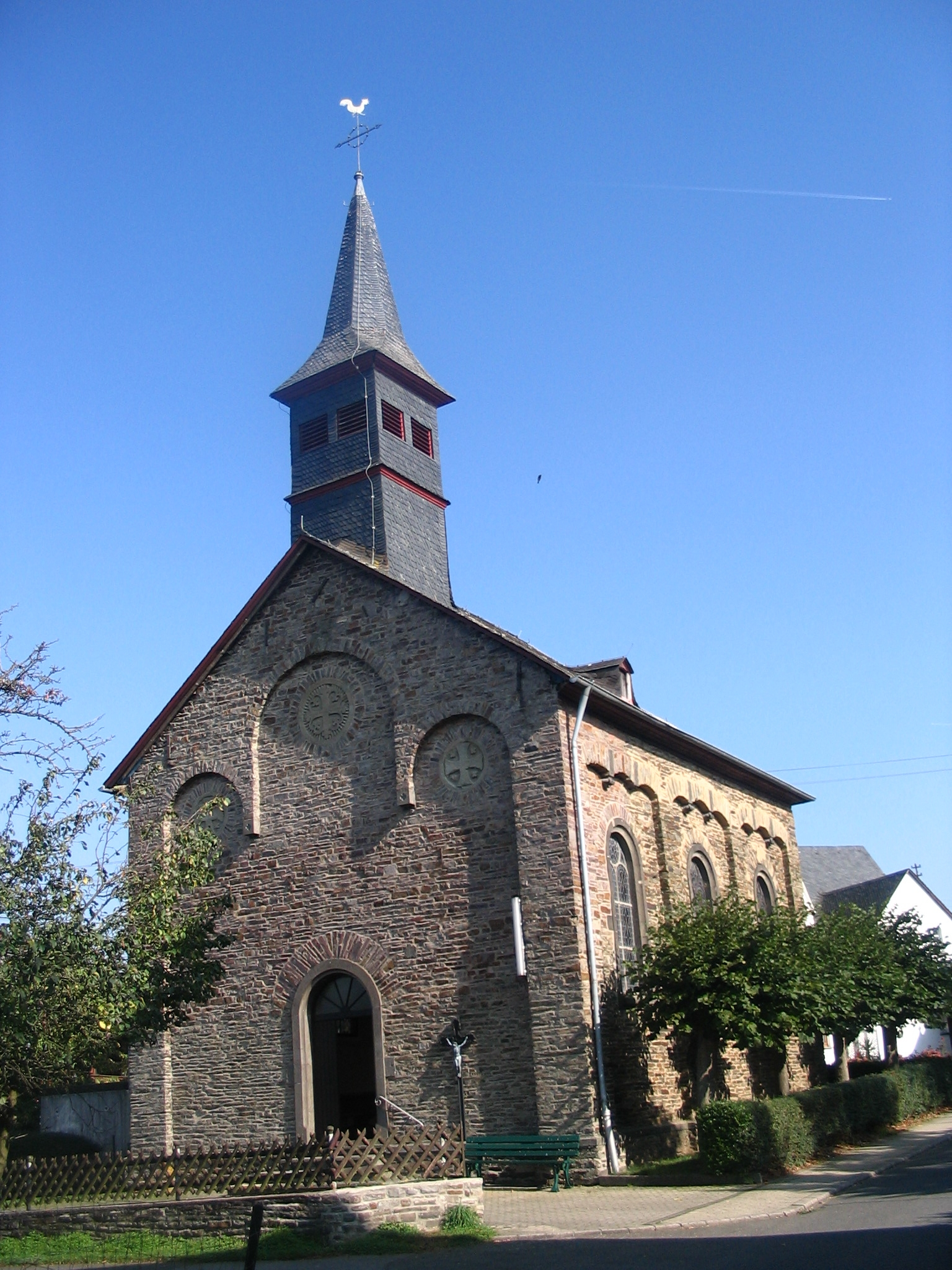
The chapel stands in the village centre

Zilshausen is an Ortsgemeinde – a municipality belonging to a Verbandsgemeinde, a kind of collective municipality – in the Rhein-Hunsrück-Kreis district in Rhineland-Palatinate, Germany. It belongs to the Verbandsgemeinde of Kastellaun.

== Geography ==
=== Location ===
The municipality lies on a high plateau in the northern Hunsrück between the valleys of the Lützbach to the east and the Dünnbach to the west.

=== Constituent communities ===
Zilshausen has one outlying Ortsteil named Petershäuser Hof.

== History ==
The village arose from an agricultural estate, which was mentioned in a document from 1346 as Zullinshausen. Zilshausen may well have belonged to the so-called “three-lord” territory, which was shared by three landholders, among them the Electorate of Trier and the House of Braunshorn-Metternich-Beilstein. This arrangement was brought to an end by the French Revolutionary occupation of lands on the Rhine’s left bank in 1794. In 1814 Zilshausen was assigned to the Kingdom of Prussia at the Congress of Vienna.

In 1933, Nazism was welcomed in Zilshausen. That year, eight men from the village joined the Sturmabteilung and on 9 November, the anniversary of the Beer Hall Putsch in 1923, there was a memorial celebration for the “heroes” who fell in Munich that day. Three days later, there was an election, which included a referendum on Adolf Hitler’s policies of withdrawing from the League of Nations and the World Disarmament Conference. Ninety-five percent of the voters – the turnout was 98% – supported Hitler. The village chronicle comments:

Unfortunately, two men had even voted “no”. They were seemingly not satisfied with the Hitler régime, or had decided thus out of a lack of understanding.

The anti-tank barriers put up at the ways into the village could not stave off Zilshausen’s conquest forever, and on 16 March 1945, the Second World War ended, at least for Zilshausen, when the village was overrun by American forces, only a day after German soldiers here had fled their posts.

Since 1946, Zilshausen has been part of the then newly founded state of Rhineland-Palatinate. Before 1 July 2014, when it was assigned to the Rhein-Hunsrück-Kreis, it was part of the Cochem-Zell district.

== Politics ==
=== Municipal council ===
The council is made up of 8 council members, who were elected by majority vote at the municipal election held on 7 June 2009, and the honorary mayor as chairman.

=== Coat of arms ===
The German blazon reads: Ein silbernes Schildhaupt, darin ein durchgehendes rotes Kreuz belegt mit einer goldenen Lilie, gespalten in Grün, vorne ein silberner Grabhügel mit Urne, hinten eine goldene Ährengarbe.

The municipality’s arms might in English heraldic language be described thus: Per pale Or a barrow of stones within which an urn argent and vert a garb of the first, on a chief of the second a cross gules surmounted by a fleur-de-lis of the first.

The translation “argent” as the tincture for the barrow and the urn is based on the German blazon, and indeed the arms shown at the municipality's own website show these charges in silver.

The red cross on silver borne in the chief is Electoral Trier's old armorial bearing. The Electorate was the village's former overlord. The golden lily is Mary's attribute, thus representing the municipality's and the church's patron saint, which Mary has been ever since the first chapel was built. The barrow with the urn inside stands for early settlement in what is now the municipality, and for the barrows from prehistory and early history found in the “Linnif” district. The golden wheat sheaf (“garb” in heraldry) recalls that the village arose from an agricultural estate. Agriculture, alongside other businesses that have set up shop, is still important to Zilshausen today.

The arms have been borne since 1986.

== Culture and sightseeing ==
=== Buildings ===
The following are listed buildings or sites in Rhineland-Palatinate’s Directory of Cultural Monuments:

==== Zilshausen (main centre) ====
- Catholic Chapel to Our Lady of Sorrows (Katholische Kapelle Zur Schmerzhaften Muttergottes) – aisleless church, quarrystone, marked 1847
- Balduinseck 2 – Quereinhaus (a combination residential and commercial house divided for these two purposes down the middle, perpendicularly to the street); timber-frame building, partly solid or slated, hipped mansard roof, 18th century

==== Petershäuser Hof ====
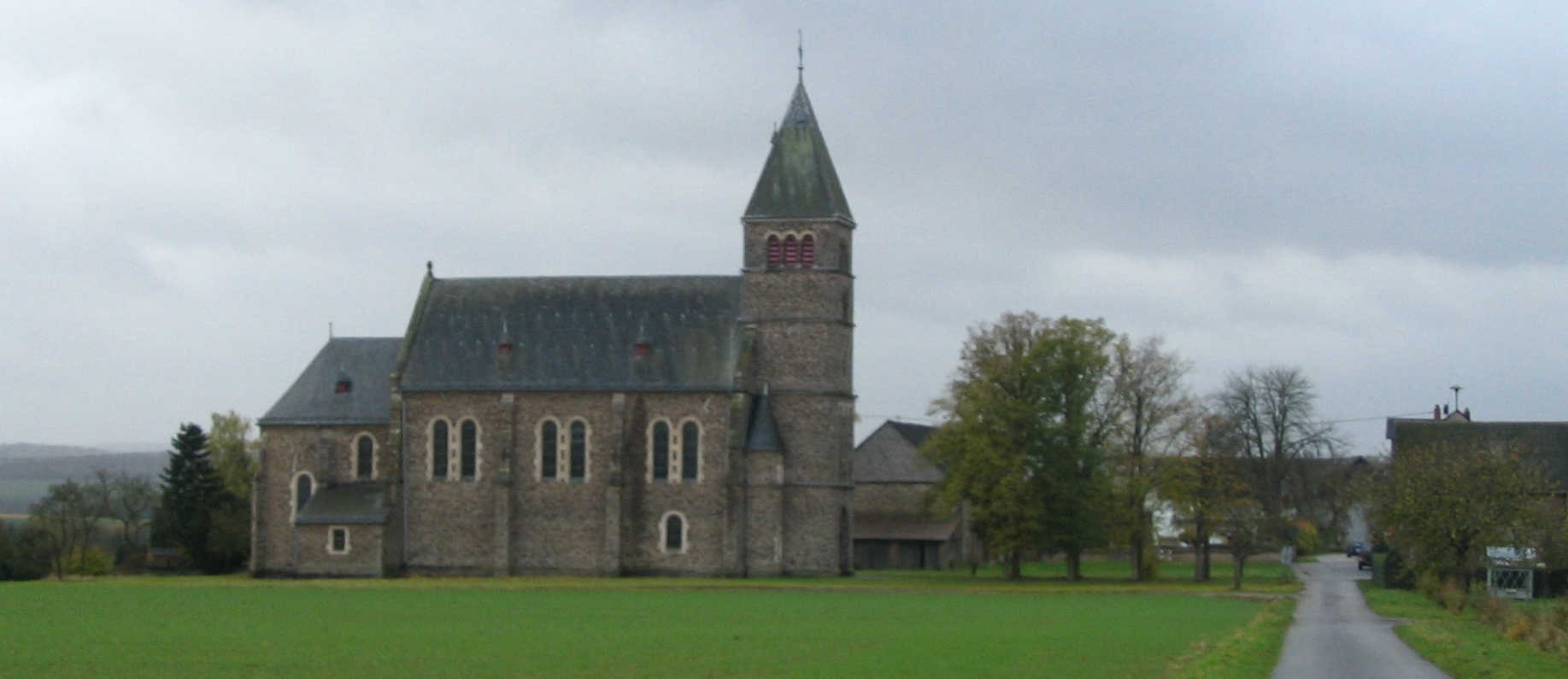
Petershäuser Hof, Hauptstraße 12: Saint Mary Magdalene's Catholic Parish Church

- Saint Mary Magdalene's Catholic Parish Church (Pfarrkirche St. Maria Magdalena), Hauptstraße 12 – Gothic Revival aisleless church, quarrystone, 1903–1905, architect Peter Marx, Trier
- Graveyard – graveyard cross, 1857; grave cross, 1751
- Chapel to the Holy Trinity (Kapelle Zur Heiligen Dreifaltigkeit) – aisleless church, 18th and 19th centuries

=== Sport and leisure ===
The Hunsrück-Mosel-Radweg, a cycling path, runs through the municipality.
