= Binningen, Rhineland-Palatinate =

Binningen
- Municipality
- Coat of arms

- Location of Binningen within Cochem-Zell district
- Interactive map of Binningen
- Location within Germany Location within Rhineland-Palatinate
- Coordinates: 50°12′21.27″N 7°14′42.50″E
- Country: Germany
- State: Rhineland-Palatinate
- District: Cochem-Zell
- Municipal assoc.: Kaisersesch

Government
  - Mayor (2019–24): Günter Urwer

Area
  - Total: 6.70 km^{2} (2.59 sq mi)
- Elevation: 300 m (980 ft)

Population (2025-12-31)
  - Total: 684
  - Density: 102/km^{2} (264/sq mi)
- Time zone: UTC+01:00 (CET)
  - Summer (DST): UTC+02:00 (CEST)
- Postal codes: 56754
- Dialling codes: 02672
- Vehicle registration: COC
- Website: www.binningen.de

Binningen is an Ortsgemeinde – a municipality belonging to a Verbandsgemeinde, a kind of collective municipality – in the Cochem-Zell district in Rhineland-Palatinate, Germany. It belongs to the Verbandsgemeinde of Kaisersesch.

== Geography ==
The municipality lies in the Eifel and indeed, calls itself the “Gateway to the Eifel”. Roughly 6 km away flows the river Moselle.

== History ==
In 1246, Binningen had its first documentary mention in connection with the Rosenthal Cistercian Convent, although it is believed that the village's history actually stretches back much further. In the Middle Ages it was part of the Electorate of Trier. The biggest landholder was the Convent, which stood in the nearby Pommerbach valley.

Beginning in 1794, Binningen lay under French rule, during which the Rosenthal Convent was dissolved, sold off and torn down. In 1815 Binningen was assigned to the Kingdom of Prussia at the Congress of Vienna. The church in Binningen was built in 1855 and is named after the two patron saints, Saint Remigius and Saint Maximus. Between 1995 and 2002, the whole church was thoroughly renovated both inside and out.

Since 1946, Binningen has been part of the then newly founded state of Rhineland-Palatinate.

== Politics ==
=== Municipal council ===
The council is made up of 12 council members, who were elected by majority vote at the municipal election held on 7 June 2009, and the honorary mayor as chairman.

=== Mayor ===
Binningen's mayor is Günter Urwer.

=== Coat of arms ===
The municipality's arms might be described thus: Argent a cross gules between in chief two bishop's mitres of the second garnished Or, in base dexter a rose vert and in base sinister a fleur-de-lis azure.

The ordinary, namely the red cross, refers to the Electorate of Trier, whose Prince-Archbishops and Electors were the local overlords until the French occupation in Napoleonic times, which began in 1794. The other charges each have their own specific meanings. The two bishop's mitres refer to the local church's two patron saints, Saint Remigius and Saint Maximus, who were both mentioned in 1556, and who are still revered and displayed at the church in Binningen. The green rose stands for the Rosenthal Cistercian Convent, which was a landholder in the village as early as 1246. The blue fleur-de-lis refers to Karden – Treis-Karden’s coat of arms also bears this charge, among others – whose collegiate foundation held an important estate in Binningen up until the 18th century.

== Culture and sightseeing ==
=== Buildings ===
The following are listed buildings or sites in Rhineland-Palatinate’s Directory of Cultural Monuments:

- Saint Remigius’s and Saint Maximus's Catholic Church (Kirche St. Remigius und Maximus), Hauptstraße – Gothic Revival quarrystone aisleless church, 1855-1857, architect, V. Statz, Cologne.
- Friedhofstraße, graveyard – basalt wayside cross from 1735.
- Hauptstraße 31 – estate complex; quarrystone building with half-hipped roof, partly timber-frame, 18th/19th century.
- Hauptstraße 35/37 – castle remnant (?), whole complex; plastered building, 17th century (?).
- Rosenthaler Weg, Jewish graveyard (monumental zone) – roughly 90 grave steles.
- Chapel, on Landesstraße (State Road) 108/Kreisstraße 29 – plastered building, Crucifixion scene inside.
- Chapel, near the Eltzerhöfe northeast of the village – with small ridge turret, from 1857.
- Ruins of the Rosenthal Convent, in the Pommerbach valley, southwest of the village – Cistercian convent founded in 1169, new building in 1786-1787, torn down after 1802; besides the former cloister, the former convent mill is preserved.

=== Dialect ===
In Binningen, a Moselle Franconian dialect is spoken. It is believed that sooner or later this dialect will die out, as so few parents now bring their children up speaking it. Under school's and the media's influence, already most children in Binningen can no longer speak it. However, most can still understand it, since their elders still mainly talk to each other in this local speech.
