= Lieg =

- Municipality
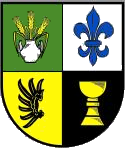
- Coat of arms

- Location of Lieg within Cochem-Zell district
- Interactive map of Lieg
- Location within Germany Location within Rhineland-Palatinate
- Coordinates: 50°08′27″N 7°20′50″E
- Country: Germany
- State: Rhineland-Palatinate
- District: Cochem-Zell
- Municipal assoc.: Cochem

Government
  - Mayor (2019–24): Heinz Zilles

Area
  - Total: 9.69 km^{2} (3.74 sq mi)
- Elevation: 320 m (1,050 ft)

Population (2025-12-31)
  - Total: 366
  - Density: 37.8/km^{2} (97.8/sq mi)
- Time zone: UTC+01:00 (CET)
  - Summer (DST): UTC+02:00 (CEST)
- Postal codes: 56290
- Dialling codes: 02672
- Vehicle registration: COC
- Website: www.lieg-hunsrueck.de

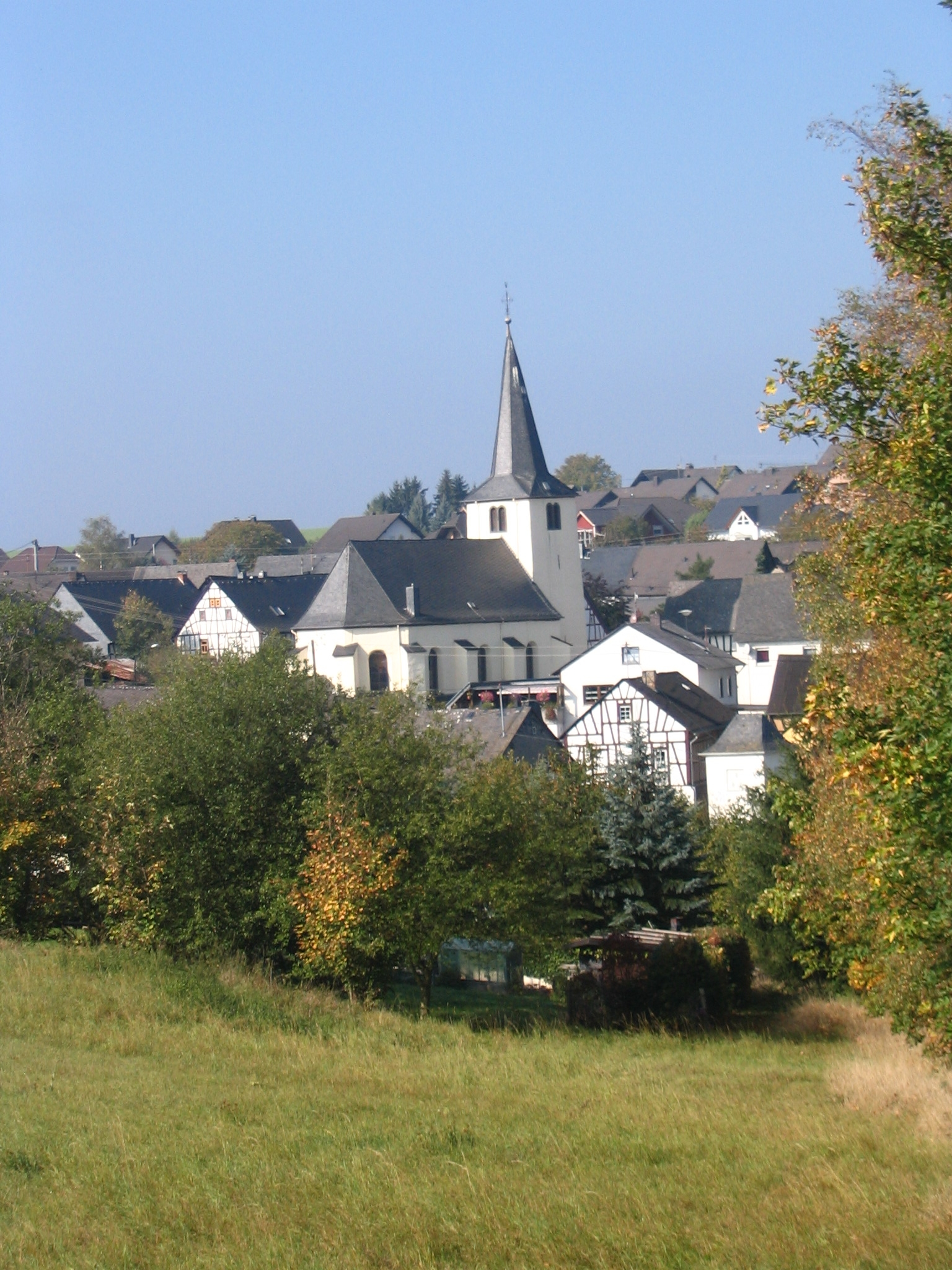
Lieg from the southeast

Lieg (German pronunciation: [liːk]) is an Ortsgemeinde – a municipality belonging to a Verbandsgemeinde, a kind of collective municipality – in the Cochem-Zell district in Rhineland-Palatinate, Germany. It belongs to the Verbandsgemeinde of Cochem.

== Geography ==
The municipality lies at the northern edge of the Hunsrück, some 6 km from the river Moselle. The village stands on a high ridge between the valleys of the Lützbach and the Dünnbach.

== History ==
There were people living in the Lieg area as early as the New Stone Age, as witnessed by stone axes that have been found. Further finds – barrows – from the Iron Age (750-50 BC) bear witness to further settlement, presumably by the Treveri, a people of mixed Celtic and Germanic stock, from whom the Latin name for the city of Trier, Augusta Treverorum, is also derived.

About 50 BC, the Romans conquered the area. Finds from this era also show that there was continuous habitation. A document from 1106 mentions a place called Lich, which might be a reference to the place known today as Lieg. Later, Lieg belonged to the so-called “three-lord” court district in Beltheim. Beginning in 1366, the lordship was shared among the Electorate of Trier, the County of Sponheim and the House of Braunshorn-Winneburg. This arrangement was brought to an end by the French Revolutionary occupation of lands on the Rhine’s left bank in 1794. In 1814 Lieg was assigned to the Kingdom of Prussia at the Congress of Vienna. Since 1946, it has been part of the then newly founded state of Rhineland-Palatinate.

On 8 March 2008, Lieg won the contest SWR 4 Stadtmusikanten. By earning 40% of the vote in a telephone poll, they beat the contestants from Pantenburg (36%) and Ediger-Eller (24%) and can now call themselves SWR 4 Stadtmusikanten.

== Politics ==
=== Municipal council ===
The council is made up of 8 council members, who were elected by majority vote at the municipal election held on 7 June 2009, and the honorary mayor as chairman.

=== Mayor ===
Lieg's mayor is Heinz Zilles.

=== Coat of arms ===
The German blazon reads: Schild geviert. Feld 1: in Grün eine silberne Urne mit drei goldenen Ähren, Feld 2: in Silber eine blaue Lilie, Feld 3: in Gold ein schwarzer Flügel, Feld 4: in Schwarz ein goldener Kelch.

In English heraldic language, the municipality's arms might be described thus: Quarterly, first vert an urn argent issuant from which three ears of wheat Or, second argent a fleur-de-lis azure, third Or a dexter wing sable, and fourth sable a chalice of the third.

The urn refers to a find in 1910, in the outlying area of Kriegwald, of a two-handled glass urn dating from the last third of the 1st century AD. The field tincture vert (green) and the three ears of wheat refer to agriculture, which is still practiced in the municipality today. The blue fleur-de-lis is a charge once borne by the collegiate chapter of Karden; Lieg is known to have belonged to this ecclesiastical institution as early as 1475. The charge in the third quarter, a wing, represents the Priory of Maria Engelport, a community of Norbertine canonesses regular. One notable member of the community was Margareta Kratz (c. 1430-c. 1532), who entered the canonry in 1450. She is honored as a Blessed by the Premonstratensian Order. Founded in 1275, the priory held an estate and a great deal of land in Lieg. These holdings were auctioned off in 1813, when the monastery was suppressed during the occupation of the city by France. The chalice in the fourth quarter is the attribute of St. Goar of Aquitaine, representing the municipality's and the church's patron saint, an honour that he is known to have held since 1656.

== Culture and sightseeing ==
=== Buildings ===
The following are listed buildings or sites in Rhineland-Palatinate’s Directory of Cultural Monuments:

- Hauptstraße 22 – estate complex; timber-frame house, partly solid, earlier half of the 19th century, timber-frame barn, partly solid, late 19th century
- Hauptstraße 33 – Quereinhaus (a combination residential and commercial house divided for these two purposes down the middle, perpendicularly to the street); timber-frame building, partly slated, mansard roof, 18th century
- Hauptstraße 34 – timber-frame house, partly solid or slated, marked 1702, quite possibly from the 19th century
- Hauptstraße 40 – Quereinhaus; timber-frame building, partly slated, 18th century
- Hauptstraße 45 – Quereinhaus; timber-frame building, partly solid, about 1800; whole complex
- Kirchstraße – Saint Goar's Catholic Parish Church (Pfarrkirche St. Goar); aisleless church, marked 1764/65, west tower, marked 1790
- Ringstraße 15 – timber-frame house, partly solid, 18th century, upper-floor addition in the 19th century
- On Landesstraße (State Road) 108 – Saint Wendelin's Chapel (Wendelinuskapelle); quarrystone building, 1908
- Wayside chapel with cross – plastered building, inside, a wayside cross, 18th century

== Clubs ==
- Hunsrückmusikanten Lieg (musicians)
- Sport club
- Volunteer fire brigade
- Church choir
- Men's choir
- Frauengemeinschaft (Women's Association)

The Hunsrück-Mosel-Radweg, a cycle path, runs through the municipality.
