= Gossberg (Hunsrück) =

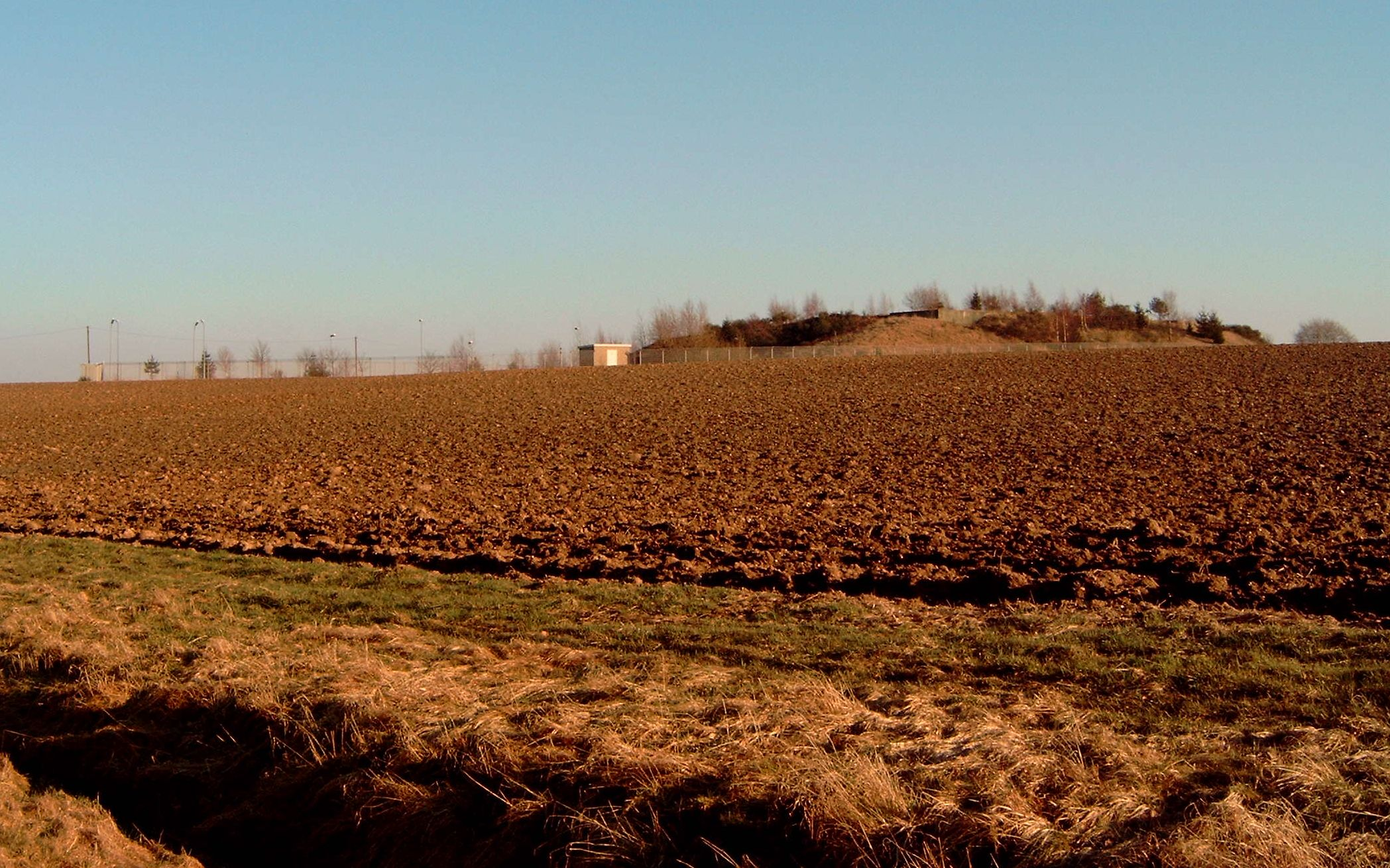
- Gossberg (view on the bunker from road)

Highest point
- Elevation: 483 m (1,585 ft)
- Coordinates: 50°01′09″N 7°25′21″E

Naming
- Native name: Goßberg (German)
- English translation: Gossberg

Geography
- Location within Rhineland-Palatinate
- Location: Rhineland-Palatinate
- Country: Germany
- Parent range: Hunsrück

The Gossberg (German: Goßberg) is a hill with the highest point of 483 m in the municipality of Wüschheim close to the border with Hundheim in the district of Rhein-Hunsrück-Kreis in the low mountain range of Hunsrück in the state of Rhineland-Palatinate, Germany. The summit was excavated 30 m deep in the period of 1984–1989 and transformed into the NBC (Nuclear, Biological, Chemical) bunker operated by U.S. Forces to serve as a fortified center of highly-secure communication among all NATO troops in Europe and a potential missile launch control center for the nearby missile base Pydna in case of anticipated (at that time) World War III.

== Geography ==
The Gemarkung of Gossberg lies on the north of the municipality of Wüschheim and to the southwest of the border between municipalities of both Bell (southeast of Hundheim) and Hasselbach. Wüschheim is an Ortsgemeinde (a standalone municipality belonging to a Verbandsgemeinde — a collective municipality in the district of Rhein-Hunsrück-Kreis) that is a part of the Verbandsgemeinde Simmern-Rheinböllen in the state of Rhineland-Palatinate, Germany. The Gossberg hill, being a part of the low mountain range of the central Hunsrück, is located 3 km to the east from “Hunsrück Heights Road” (German: Hunsrückhöhenstraße — a scenic route through the Hunsrück, initially used as a strategic military road built on the orders of Hermann Göring), officially known as the federal highway B 327 connecting Kappel (6 km to the southwest of Gossberg), Kastellaun (6 km to the north of Gossberg), and Koblenz. South of Gossberg, there is the Landesstraße L 226, which connects Wüschheim with Simmern (8 km to the southeast of Gossberg) and B 327. The Frankfurt–Hahn Airport is 17 km to the southwest of Gossberg via B 327.

== History ==
Excavations made in the 1930s in the vicinity of Gossberg revealed findings of a Roman past, in particular a villa rustica.

In general, from 1978 to 1992, the NATO's reconnaissance unit Metro Tango (MT), led by U.S. Forces, provided guidance and coordination of tactical missiles and air forces respectively. Name of the unit derives from the first letters of the "Missile Training" collocation, that indeed accurately describes the primary mission of unit's location in the municipality of Wüschheim.

Gossberg, historically being militarily and strategically important area (since 1956, was a location of a radar system of the U.S. Forces), during 1984–1989 was excavated 30 m deep in order to accommodate the subsequently constructed NBC (Nuclear, Biological, Chemical) bunker to be operated by the MT unit, which was already stationed about 4 km southwest of Gossberg in the direction of Kappel on the federal highway B 327. Responsibilities of the MT unit at Gossberg included the signals intelligence (SIGINT), the communications security (COMSEC), the radar, the determination of targets, the air defense, and most prominently the control of ready-to-fire launch facilities for cruise missiles carrying nuclear warheads (and their corresponding guidance) located at the nearby (approximately 3 km north of the bunker) missile base Pydna (known under the code name of the Wüschheim Air Station) between Bell and Hasselbach.

Hahn Air Base, today known as the international airport, Frankfurt–Hahn, participated in preparations for deployment of BGM-109G Ground Launched Cruise Missile (GCLM) units from 1982 to 1985, as well as their maintenance by the reactivated (on 1 April 1985) 38th Tactical Missile Wing (TMW) at Pydna from 1985 to 1990.

At the beginning of the 1990s, the facility was given up on the basis of the overall relaxation of geopolitical tensions between the Eastern Bloc and the Western Bloc (see Cold War), globally recognized decrease in the probability of the nuclear warfare threat, and the associated disarmament. As a result, the bunker was never put into operation.

As of 2017, the Gossberg bunker is available for sale and rent at negotiable price.

== The Bunker ==
=== Construction Cost ===
The total construction costs approximately amount to US$90,000,000 (equivalent to about $206,485,653 in 2025) up to the end of construction in 1992.

=== Construction Data ===
The bunker has two nested shield hulls, the inner and the outer, each produced out of reinforced concrete. The thickness of the inner shield hull is 0.80 m, while of the outer one is double of the former. Both shield hulls are separated by hollow space with a width of 2.00 m, which serves three major purposes:

- provide two escape routes to the corresponding emergency exits;
- ventilation of interior spaces;
- in case of an actual (nuclear) rocket strike, the outer shield hull would (potentially) collapse into that hollow space (potentially) damaging the inner shield hull but leaving the interior structure bed intact (the same principle as spaced armor).

The thickness of the bottom plate is 1.00 m, while of the cover plate of the inner shield hull is between 1.00 m and 1.20 m. The cover plate of the outer shield hull consists of a so-called Zerschellschicht (a layer of lean concrete on top of the reinforced concrete construction to mitigate damage inflicted by explosions) with a thickness of 1.05 m and an overlying layer of fluid concrete with quartzite blocks with a thickness of 1.10 m. Finally, there is a soil layer of 0.40 m on top as a green roof.

The entire building extends for about 13.30 m deep under the ground and for about 10.35 m above the ground, while the horizontal dimensions (length × width) of it are 50.30 m × 45.80 m respectively. Hence, the gross area is around 17,000 m^{2} (including the outer plot area), the gross volume is roughly 28,000 m^{3}, and the summit of Gossberg is 8.00 m higher than before the construction.

=== Internal Structure ===
Internally, the bunker is a three-story building, where the two upper stories are connected with two stairways and a heavy elevator (up to 10,000 kg), while the two lower stories are connected only with a steel ladder. Physical security and separation between rooms are achieved by a sluice system with an option to manage it via the central access control panel.

==== Story 2: Office and Main Working Area ====
The purpose of story 2 (ground floor) is to accommodate administration, security surveillance, computer equipment, and electrical engineering. By default, it contains nine rooms, but could be expeditiously reconfigured (by operating staff on their own, potentially during ongoing war) thanks to (re)movable walls, suspended ceiling, and raised floor (on stilts). In addition, there are two toilet rooms and a power supply room. To summarize, the net internal (usable) area is 1,185 m^{2} and maximum floor load is 2,000 kg/m^{2}. Other features include:

- perforated floor with natural carpet;
- exit signs;
- fire alarm system;
- fire suppression system;
- uninterruptible power supply;
- dust collector;
- high-performance air conditioning cabinets;
- glare-free lighting with electromagnetic security;
- emergency lighting;
- configurable temperature and humidity on a per room basis.

==== Story 1: Laboratory, Technical and Storage Rooms ====
The purpose of story 1 (underground floor) is to technologically sustain the building and provide storage space (e.g. for food, equipment, weapons, etc.), where part of that space could be utilized as laboratory. Walls are not (re)movable, types of both ceiling and floor vary between rooms. In addition, there are two toilet rooms, a sanitary room, and a decontamination shower room. To summarize, the net internal (usable) area is 1,664 m^{2} and maximum floor load is 5,000 kg/m^{2}. Other features include:

- exit signs;
- fire alarm system;
- fire suppression system;
- low voltage supply system;
- electrical filter system (against eavesdropping);
- compressor system;
- air conditioning system;
- ventilation system;
- decontamination system;
- water treatment system;
- emergency power controller;
- emergency power system (two generators of 1000 kW each);
- emergency heating system (160 kW);
- emergency cooling system (towers);
- emergency air supply system;
- uninterruptible power supply;
- heat pump;
- cooling machinery;
- hydraulic motors for elevator.

==== Story 0: Technical Rooms and Storage Tanks ====
The purpose of story 0 (underground floor) is to technologically sustain the building and provide storage tanks (e.g. for water and oil). The corresponding net internal (usable) area is only 450 m^{2}. Storage tanks include:

- tank for drinking water (50 m^{3});
- tank for tap water (750 m^{3});
- tank for used water (30 m^{3});
- tank for contaminated water (20 m^{3});
- tank for oil (100 m^{3}).

=== Outer Plot ===
The outer plot is surrounded by a fence of about 2.00 m high and its gross area is 13,783 m^{2}. It contains road and parking paved with interlocking brick stones, which officially offers a helipad, a small transformer building, and a hill of about 10.35 m high with an entrance to the bunker. The entrance has area of roughly 500 m^{2} and is protected by a massive armored sliding door weighing more than 28,000 kg.

=== Maintenance Details ===
- directly connected to the public water supply and sewage;
- directly connected to the electric power distribution with three own transformers;
- lighting protection.

=== Telecommunication Details ===
- optical fiber cables;
- ISDN.

== Bibliography ==
- Mindling, George; Bolton, Robert (October 3, 2011). U.S. Air Force Tactical Missiles. lulu.com. ISBN 978-0557000296.
- Schröder, Georg (November 22, 2012). Der Hunsrück: Ein Erlebnisbericht. epubli.de. ISBN 978-3844237955.
