= Wüschheim =

- Municipality
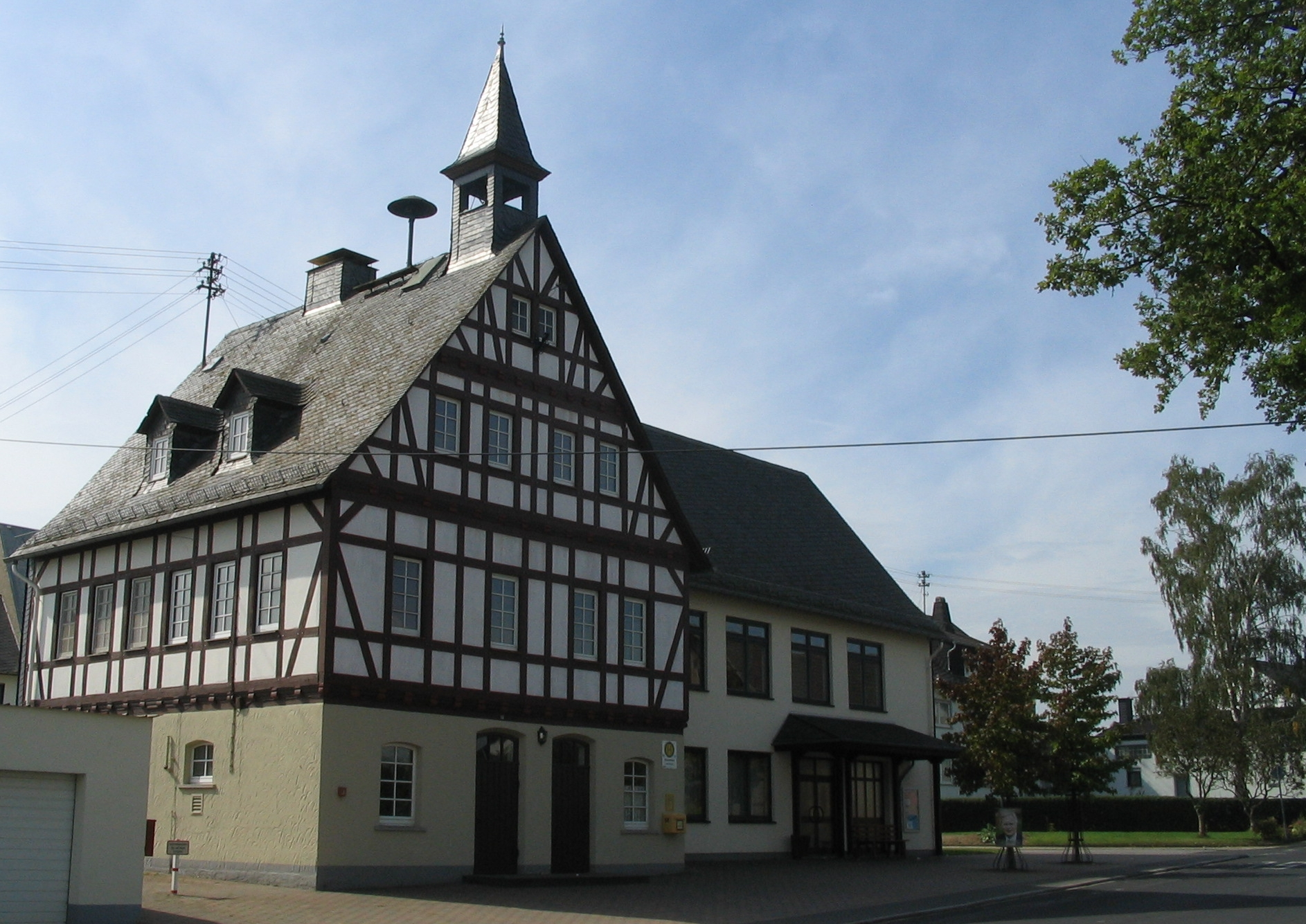

- Coat of arms

- Location of Wüschheim within Rhein-Hunsrück-Kreis district
- Interactive map of Wüschheim
- Location within Germany Location within Rhineland-Palatinate
- Coordinates: 50°00′47″N 7°25′24″E
- Country: Germany
- State: Rhineland-Palatinate
- District: Rhein-Hunsrück-Kreis
- Municipal assoc.: Simmern-Rheinböllen

Government
  - Mayor (2019–24): Alfred Schwebach

Area
  - Total: 3.90 km^{2} (1.51 sq mi)
- Elevation: 441 m (1,447 ft)

Population (2025-12-31)
  - Total: 310
  - Density: 79/km^{2} (210/sq mi)
- Time zone: UTC+01:00 (CET)
  - Summer (DST): UTC+02:00 (CEST)
- Postal codes: 55471
- Dialling codes: 06761
- Vehicle registration: SIM
- Website: www.wueschheim.de

Wüschheim is an Ortsgemeinde – a municipality belonging to a Verbandsgemeinde, a kind of collective municipality – in the Rhein-Hunsrück-Kreis (district) in Rhineland-Palatinate, Germany. It belongs to the Verbandsgemeinde Simmern-Rheinböllen, whose seat is in Simmern.

== Geography ==
=== Location ===
The municipality lies in the central Hunsrück some 3 km from the Hunsrückhöhenstraße (“Hunsrück Heights Road”, a scenic road across the Hunsrück built originally as a military road on Hermann Göring’s orders), on the road that leads between Kappel and the Blümlingshof (a homestead in Bell-Völkenroth) eastwards from the Hunsrückhöhenstraße through the so-called Biebertal (Bieberbach valley) by way of Biebern to Simmern. Wüschheim lies roughly 8 km west-northwest of Simmern.

== History ==
On the ground floor of the timber-frame house that serves as the municipal centre, a bakehouse, which is still functional today, was built, along with a livestock stable. The stable was converted, half becoming a youth centre and the other half an equipment room for the Wüschheim volunteer fire brigade. The Wüschheim municipal centre was thoroughly renovated in the 1980s and also expanded considerably with a festival hall with kitchen and refrigeration rooms.

The Goßberg, a mountain lying within Wüschheim’s municipal limits, was expanded in the 1980s and was to have served as the main base for the Wüschheim Air Station (or WAS) – the Pydna missile base – after the move from “Metro Tango” – also within Wüschheim's municipal limits – was completed.

== Politics ==
=== Municipal council ===
The council is made up of 6 council members, who were elected by majority vote at the municipal election held on 7 June 2009, and the honorary mayor as chairman.

=== Mayor ===
Wüschheim's mayor is Alfred Schwebach.

=== Coat of arms ===
The municipality's arms might be described thus: vert a timber-frame building with a belltower argent with windows and doors gules, on a base bendy lozengy argent and azure an oakleaf fesswise Or.

The arms have been borne since 1980.

== Culture and sightseeing ==
=== Buildings ===
The following are listed buildings or sites in Rhineland-Palatinate’s Directory of Cultural Monuments:

- Hauptstraße 13 – municipal centre; timber-frame building, partly solid, 1930s

=== Sport and leisure ===
On the municipal centre's ground floor is a youth centre. The former bakehouse at the municipal centre, the Backes, has been converted into a clubhouse pub for the local pheasant club

Some 100 m west of the edge of the village is a grilling pavilion. The lands around this offer playground equipment, a paved basketball court, a small football pitch and some 50 parking spaces.

In the summer of 2006, the former beet washing facility on the Bieberbach (100 m north of the grilling pavilion) was converted into a Kneipp wading bath.

The Biebertaler-Rundweg (path) links the villages of the Bieberbach valley over its 26.5 km length.

At the former missile base, Pydna, not far from Wüschheim and Hasselbach, the electronic music festival Nature One has been held since 1996, lasting several days each year and drawing some 50,000 visitors.

A motorsport driving facility was set up within Wüschheim's municipal limits in the late 1990s towards the Hunsrückhöhenstraße on lands once used as a munitions depot by the United States armed forces. This is used for driving safety training by several organizations and as a test course by various car manufacturers.

At the edge of the Goßberg, within Hundheim's limits is an airfield for ultralights.
