= Kastellaun Castle =

- Burg Kastellaun
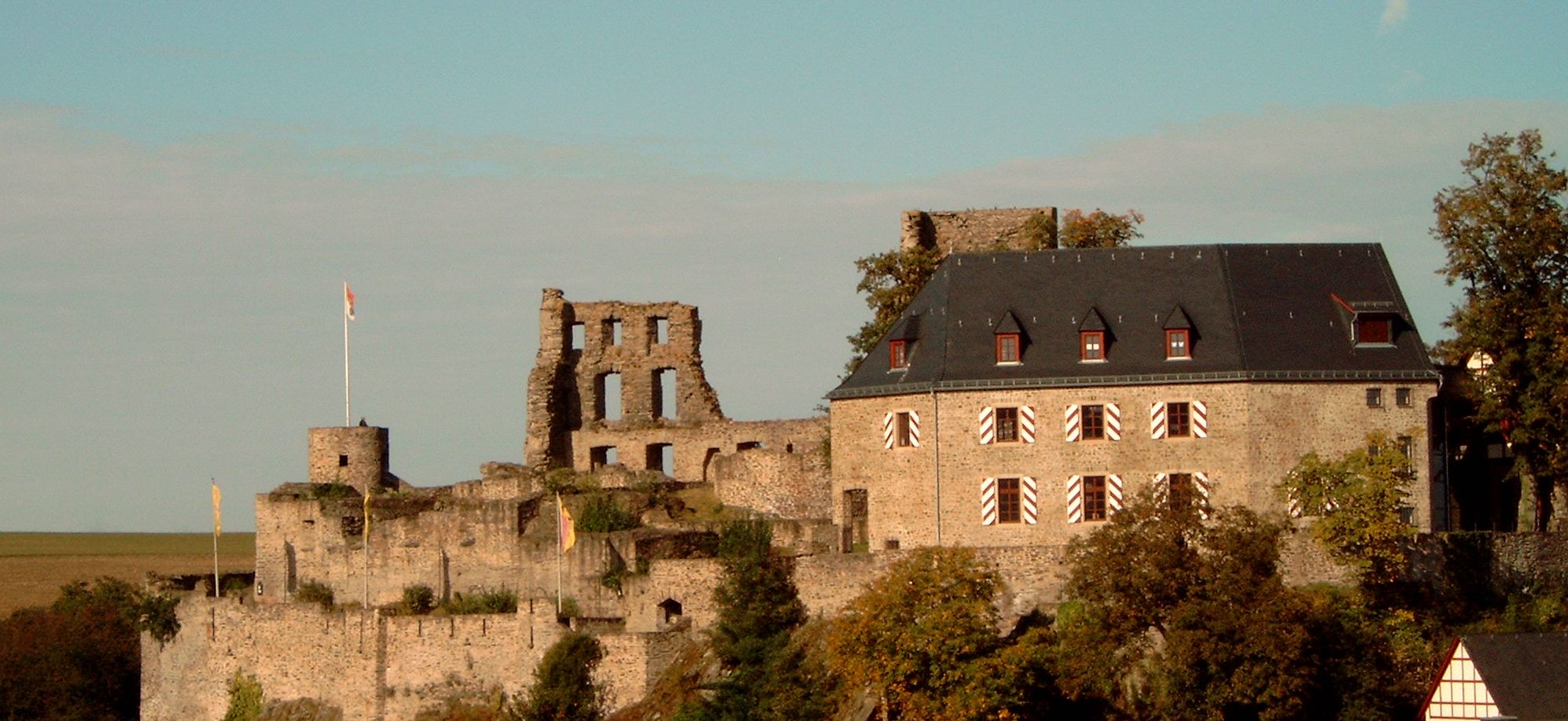
- ruins of the lower castle
- Interactive map of the Kastellaun Castle area

General information
- Location: Kastellaun, Rhineland-Palatinate, Germany
- Coordinates: 50°4′15″N 7°26′18″E
- Completed: ca. 1200 - 1226

Kastellaun Castle (German: Burg Kastellaun) is a ruined medieval castle in Kastellaun in the Rhein-Hunsrück district in Rhineland-Palatinate, Germany.

== Location ==
The ruins of the castle are on the castle hill above the town of Kastellaun and are connected to the former wall of the town.

== History ==
Constructed in the 13th century, the castle is first mentioned in 1226 as Kestilun, a possession of the Count of Sponheim. In 1301 it was the residence of Simon II, Count of Sponheim-Kreuznach.

In 1321, Archbishop Baldwin of Trier besieged the castle. In 1325 he built the neighbouring Burg Balduinseck as a challenge to Sponheim.

After Walram of Sponheim-Kreuznach abandoned Kastellaun in 1340, the castle was administered by bailiffs and burgmänner. The line of the counts of Sponheim subsequently died out and the castle descended with the title to Bernhard II, Margrave of Baden and Count Friedrich of Veldenz, who ruled jointly in a "condominium".

The last Count of Veldenz died in 1444 and his share of the rulership passed to his son-in-law Stephen, Count Palatine of Simmern-Zweibrücken. This drew the Rear County of Sponheim into the Palatine sphere of influence, involving it in war and the possession of the Palatinate.

In 1594 Edward Fortunatus retreated to Castle Kastellaun after losing the Margravate of Baden, and it became a residence again.

During the Thirty Years' War, from 1618 to 1648, the castle was occupied. During the War of the Palatine Succession, in 1689, it was destroyed by French troops and was not rebuilt.

In 1820 the ruins came into private hands. In 1884 the municipality of Kastellaun bought them and made the first repairs to stabilise them. From 1990 to 1993 the hill and the ruins there were cleaned up. The lower castle and access were restored.

== Architecture ==
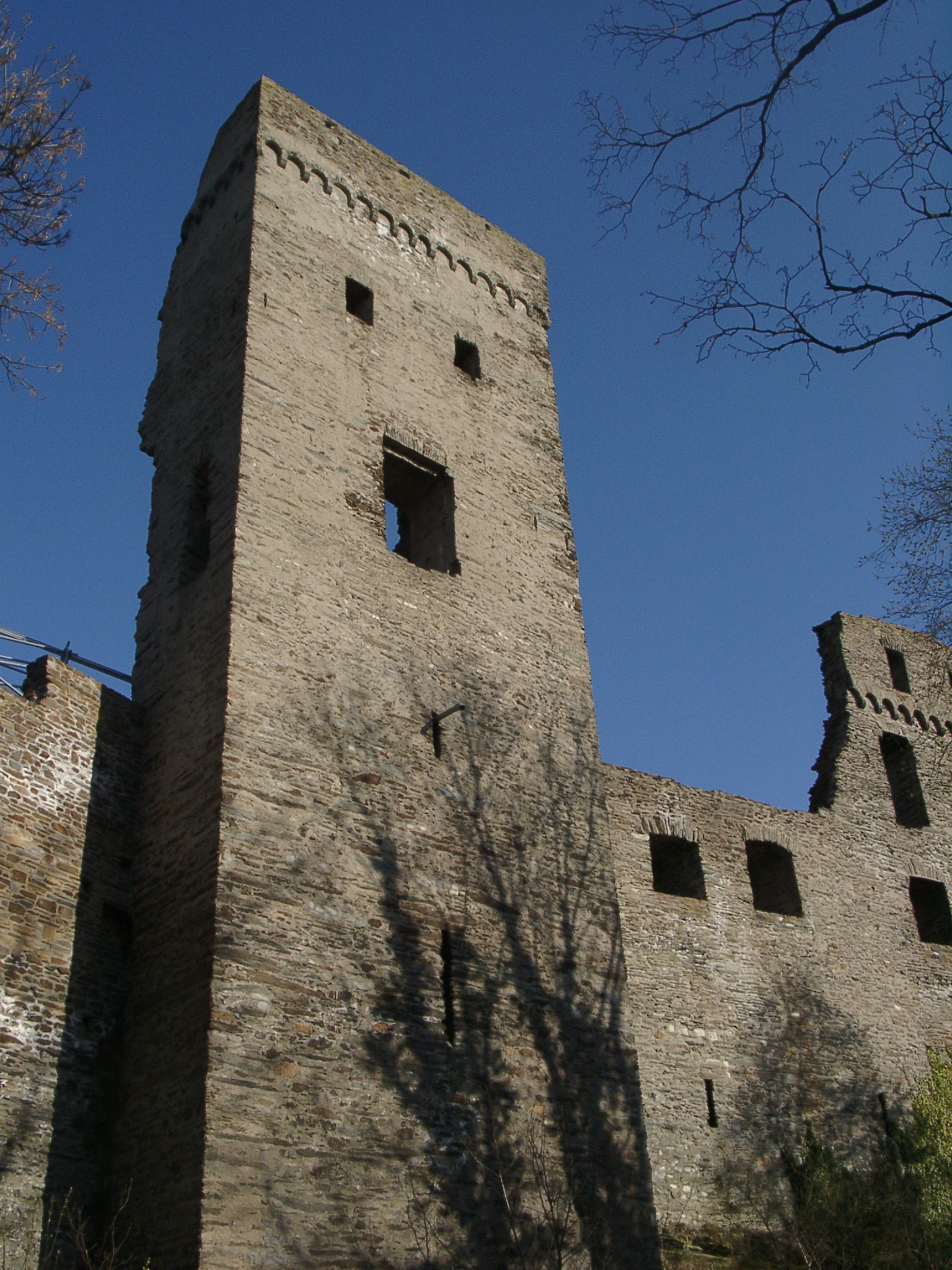
Ruins of the bergfried

The castle consists of an inner and outer baileys. The inner ward includes the remains of the defensive bergfried, the enceinte and two residential buildings. The older east building dates to the 14th century; excavations in 1990-93 uncovered its cellar. The ruin on the west side of the inner bailey that can be seen from far away is what remains of the east end of the palas and the adjacent rectangular powder tower. Both of these buildings were probably built no earlier than the 16th century. On the east side, facing the town, there is a secondary defensive wall or zwinger. In the outer bailey, two modern buildings now stand on old foundations. Originally entry to the castle was by way of a gate tower in the north corner. The current entrance is modern.

== Present-day use ==
The former palas (residential building with the great hall) is used as an open-air stage for theatrical performances.

Restaurateurs now operate in the castle cellars and parts of the new buildings constructed on old foundations in the lower castle during 2006-07. They offer among other things medieval-style feasts.

In addition, on Sundays in summer the municipality of Kastellaun offers a children's activity programme. Further special events attract particularly large numbers of visitors to the ruin.

On 9 September 2007, a documentation centre was dedicated in the lower bailey. It issues a pamphlet on the most important events in the region from early times to the present. On the ground floor, in a "House of Regional History", the primary stages of the Celtic and Roman past of the Kastellaun region are displayed. A reconstruction of the wagon burial discovered in Bell in 1938, remains of Celtic pottery, fibulæ and jewellery, and a model of a Roman legionary's helmet convey an impression of how our ancestors once lived. The first floor depicts the life of the knights and nobility in castles in Hunsrück during the Middle Ages. On the upper floor are models and information about the former Pydna missile base and the Hunsrück peace movement as well as the current usage as a federal defence installation and festival site (Nature One).

== See also ==
- List of castles in Rhineland-Palatinate
