= Tobias Vogt (politician, born 1988) =

German politician (born 1988)

Member of the Landtag of Rhineland-Palatinate
- Incumbent
- Assumed office 18 May 2021
- Preceded by: Hans-Josef Bracht
- Constituency: Rhein-Hunsrück

Personal details
- Born: 8 October 1988 (age 38)
- Party: Christian Democratic Union

Tobias Vogt (born 8 October 1988) is a German politician serving as a member of the Landtag of Rhineland-Palatinate since 2021. He has served as mayor of Buch since 2014, and as chairman of the Christian Democratic Union in the Rhein-Hunsrück-Kreis since 2020.
