= Eberhard Kieser =

German engraver and publisher

Eberhard Kieser (December 2, 1583 in Kastellaun – November 1631, in Frankfurt am Main) was a German engraver and publisher.

== Personal ==
Kieser was the son of a pastor. He learned the goldsmith's trade. In the early summer of 1609, through his marriage with Anna Christina Hoffmann, a painter's daughter, he received citizen's rights in Frankfurt am Main, worked as a goldsmith in Sachsenhausen and began to draw and engrave. From 1612 he illustrated and published books and produced illustrative prints in his publishing workshop with several engravers as assistants.

== Work ==
His most important work is a Dance of Death after Holbein, consisting of 60 small-format etchings from 1617.

Kieser is also known for the Thesaurus philopoliticus (German title: Politisches Schatzkästlein guter Herren und bestendiger Freund), a collection of copperplate engravings with city views, which Kieser and Daniel Meisner (1585–1625), originally from Bohemia, produced and successfully published. These engravings appeared in 16 books with 831 city images until 1631. Each picture has a motto in Latin and German, written by Meisner. It is not certain that Kieser produced printing plates for the thesaurus in addition to his publishing activities.

From 1617/18 Sebastian Furck, and later Georg Keller, Matthäus Merian, and Johann Eckard Löffler worked for Kieser. In 1631 the printing plates were acquired by Nuremberg publisher Paul Fürst after Kieser's death . In 1638/42 Fürst published around 800 of the engravings in the work Sciographia Cosmica in 8 volumes; In 1678 and 1700 further editions followed from the widow and son-in-law of Fürst.

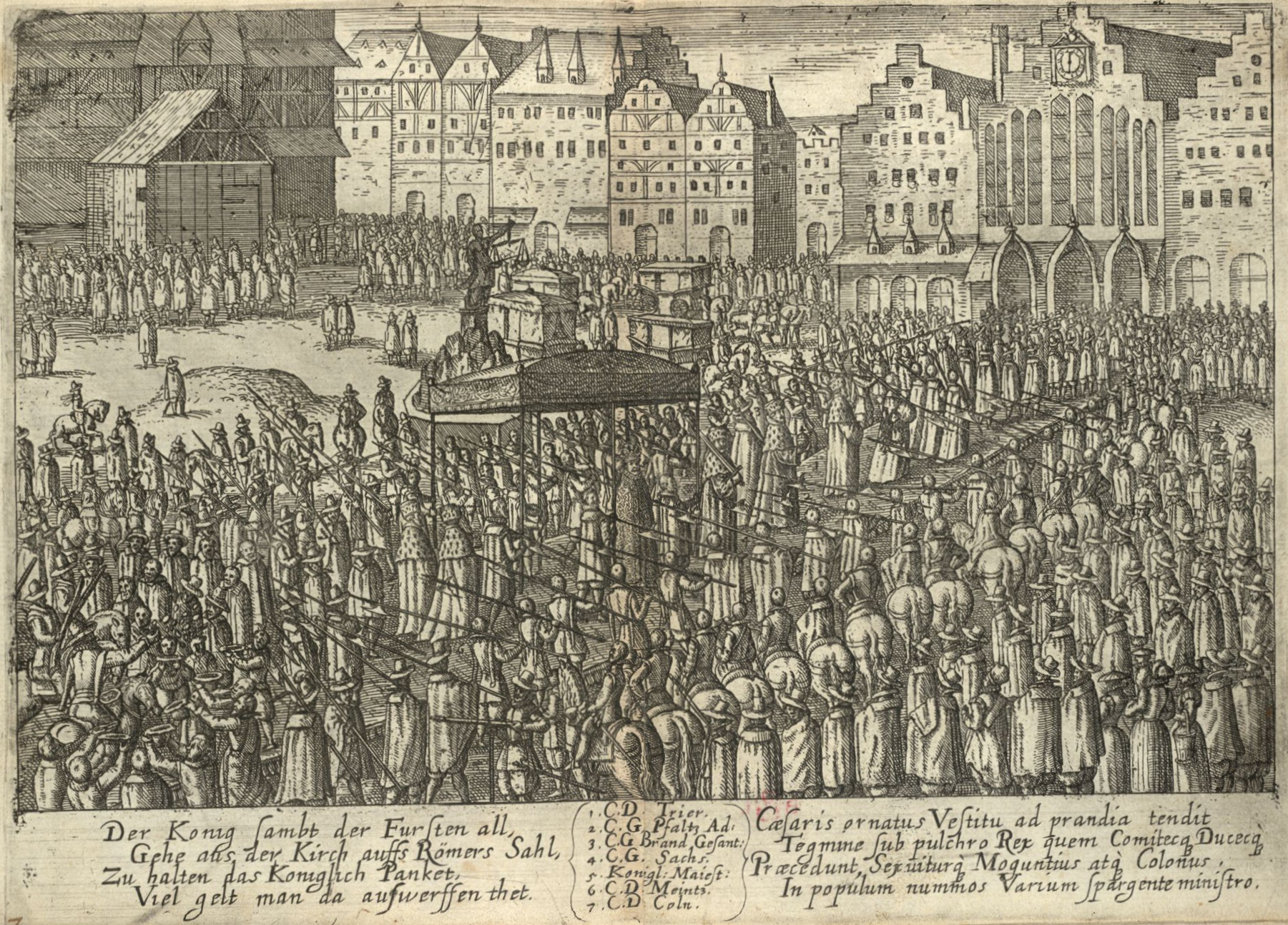
Coronation procession of Matthias on June 13, 1612 in front of the Römer in Frankfurt

In addition to the Thesaurus philopoliticus, the type of engravings and etchings suggest Georg Keller as an artist:

- Krönungsdiarium Maximilians II., 1612
- Johann Jacob Wallhausen's Ritterkunst, Frankfurt 1616
- Johann Jacob Wallhausen's Romantische Kriegskunst, Frankfurt 1616
- Österreichischer Lorbeerkranz, 1625

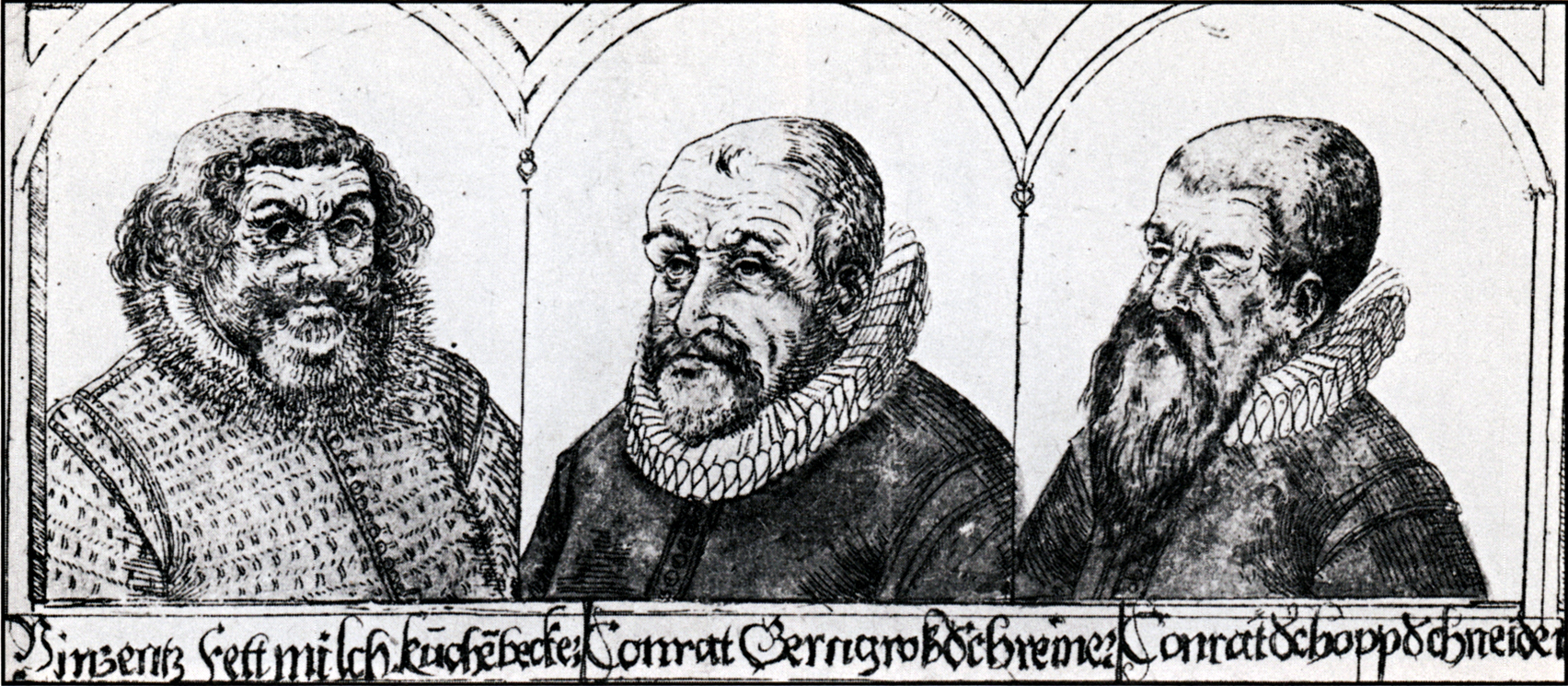
Vinzenz Fettmilch, Conrad Gerngroß and Conrad Schopp, leaders of The Fettmilch Rising on an engraving from 1614

In addition, Kieser published a 78-sheet series of emperors, electors and nobles on horseback as well as portraits of Fettmilch, Schopp, Gerngros and Ebel (leaders of the Fettmilch uprising) in the style of Sebastian Furck.
