= Buch, Rhein-Hunsrück =

Buch
- Municipality
- Coat of arms

- Location of Buch within Rhein-Hunsrück-Kreis district
- Interactive map of Buch
- Location within Germany Location within Rhineland-Palatinate
- Coordinates: 50°4′35.93″N 7°23′17.13″E
- Country: Germany
- State: Rhineland-Palatinate
- District: Rhein-Hunsrück-Kreis
- Municipal assoc.: Kastellaun

Government
  - Mayor (2019–24): Tobias Vogt

Area
  - Total: 13.45 km^{2} (5.19 sq mi)
- Elevation: 408 m (1,339 ft)

Population (2025-12-31)
  - Total: 852
  - Density: 63.3/km^{2} (164/sq mi)
- Time zone: UTC+01:00 (CET)
  - Summer (DST): UTC+02:00 (CEST)
- Postal codes: 56290
- Dialling codes: 06762
- Vehicle registration: SIM
- Website: www.gemeinde-buch.de

Buch (German pronunciation: [buːx]) is an Ortsgemeinde – a municipality belonging to a Verbandsgemeinde, a kind of collective municipality – in the Rhein-Hunsrück-Kreis (district) in Rhineland-Palatinate, Germany. It belongs to the Verbandsgemeinde of Kastellaun, whose seat is in the like-named town.

== Geography ==
=== Location ===
The municipality lies on a ridge in the Hunsrück between the deeply cut valleys of two local streams, the Wohnrother Bach and the Dünnbach at an elevation of some 400 m above sea level. The municipality’s centres (Ortsteile) of Buch and Mörz lie some 45 km south-southwest of Koblenz and 4 km west of Kastellaun.

== History ==
In 1052, Buch had its first documentary mention. In 1332, Louis the Bavarian acknowledged to Archbishop Baldwin of Trier all the holdings of the Archiepiscopal Foundation of Trier, among which were Balduinseck (castle) and Buch. Buch belonged to the Beltheim court. Until the late 15th century, it is known that there was a knightly family named “von Buch”. Beginning in 1794, Buch lay under French rule. In 1815 it was assigned to the Kingdom of Prussia at the Congress of Vienna. Since 1946, it has been part of the then newly founded state of Rhineland-Palatinate. The municipality in its current form came into being on 17 March 1974 through the amalgamation of the municipality of Buch with what was until then the self-administering municipality of Mörz.

== Politics ==
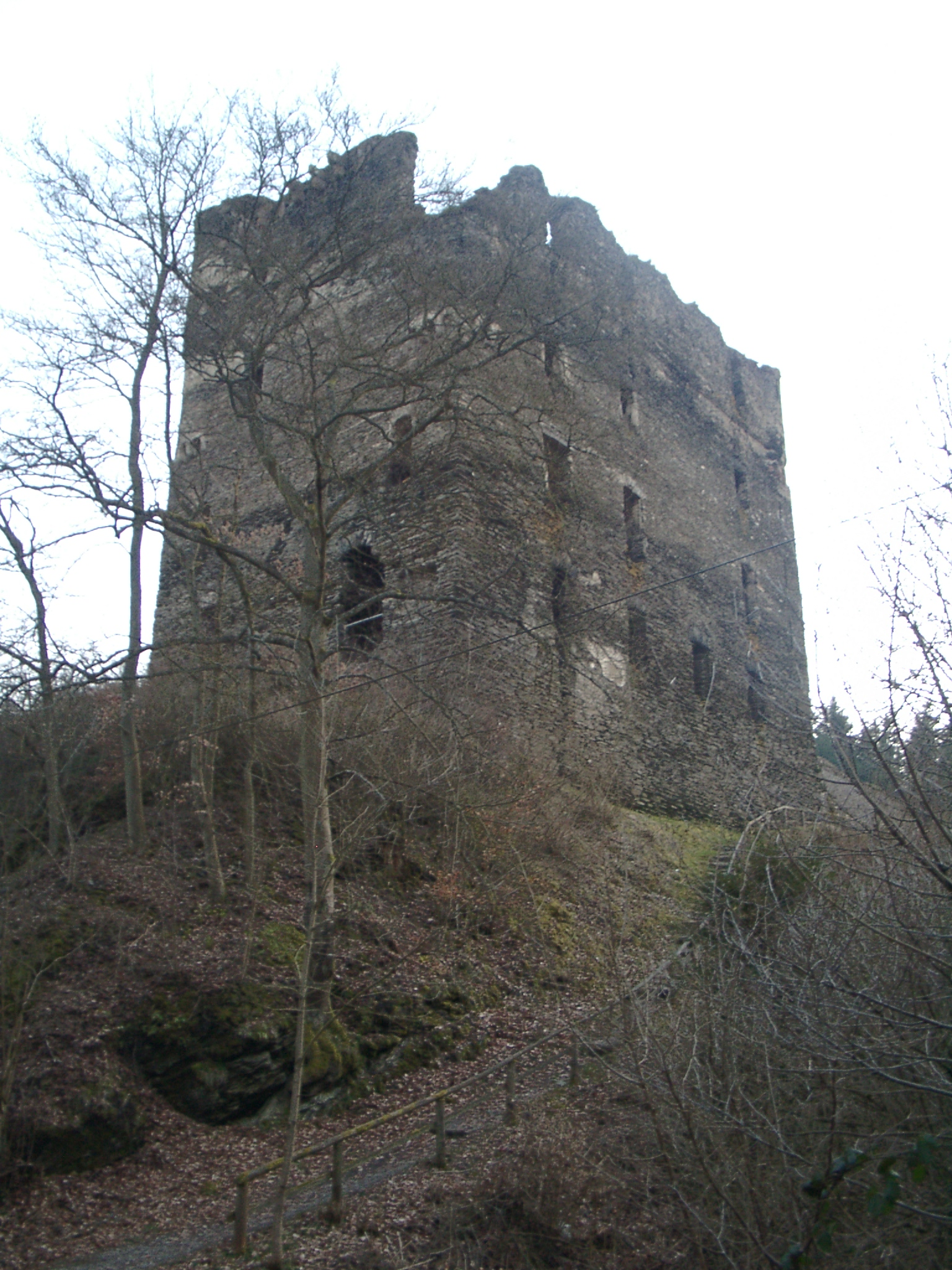
Buch, Balduinseck castle ruin monumental zone

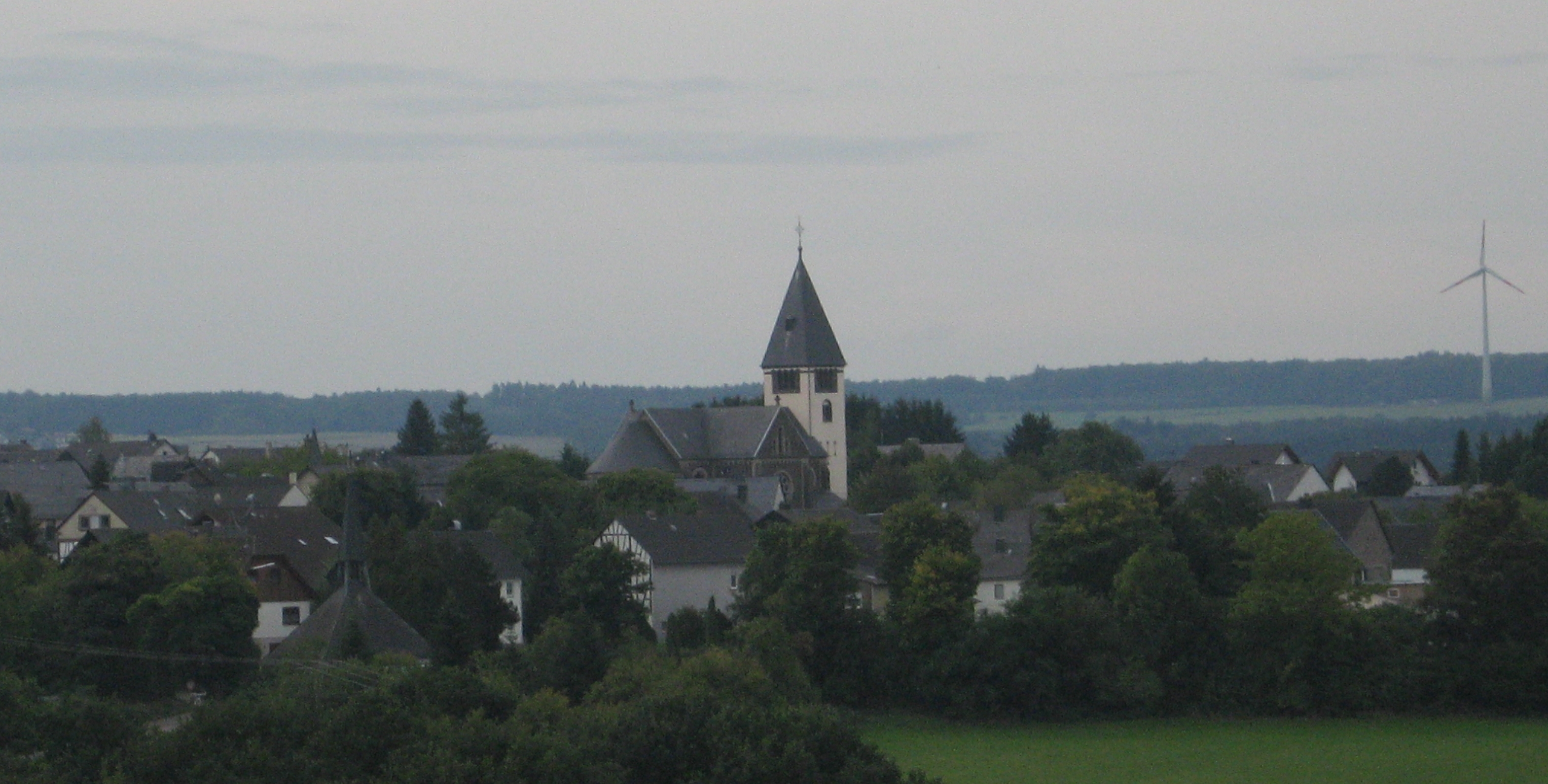
Buch, Hauptstraße 56: Saint Nicholas’s Catholic Parish Church

=== Municipal council ===
The council is made up of 12 council members, who were elected at the municipal election held on 7 June 2009, and the honorary mayor as chairman.

=== Mayor ===
Buch’s mayor is Tobias Vogt. The outlying centre of Mörz also has an administrative head on council bearing the title Ortsvorsteher. The current one is Stefanie Schneiders.

== Culture and sightseeing ==
=== Buildings ===
The following are listed buildings or sites in Rhineland-Palatinate’s Directory of Cultural Monuments:

==== Buch (main centre) ====
- Saint Nicholas’s Catholic Parish Church (Pfarrkirche St. Nikolaus), Hauptstraße 56 – tower, marked 1723, slate quarrystone columned basilica, 1901/1902, architect E. Endler, Cologne; two basalt grave crosses, one marked 1743; basalt tomb slab; basalt warriors’ memorial; whole complex of buildings
- Beller Weg 6 – former monastic estate; L-shaped estate; timber-frame house, partly slated, half-hipped roof, 18th century, commercial wing, 19th and 20th centuries; whole complex of buildings
- Hauptstraße – graveyard; sandstone graveyard cross, marked 1833
- Hauptstraße 21 – building with hipped mansard roof, timber-frame, sided, early 19th century
- Hauptstraße 28 – building with hipped mansard roof, timber-frame, partly slated, last fourth of the 18th century
- Between Hauptstraße 28 and 30 – basalt wayside cross, 18th century
- Hauptstraße 39 – building with hipped mansard roof, timber-frame, partly solid and slated, marked 1802
- Hauptstraße, on the way out of Buch on Landesstraße 204 – chapel, quarrystone building, marked 1858; cast-iron grave cross, Rheinböllen Ironworks, 1870
- Im Gäßchen 7 – timber-frame Quereinhaus (a combination residential and commercial house divided for these two purposes down the middle, perpendicularly to the street), partly solid, 19th century
- Mörsdorfer Straße 1 – Quereinhaus; building with hipped mansard roof, timber framing plastered, about 1880, stable-barn wing from late 19th or early 20th century; whole complex of buildings
- Balduinseck castle ruin (monumental zone) – built beginning in 1325 by Archbishop Baldwin of Luxembourg, finished about 1332, by 1780 in disrepair, parts of the courtyard wall renovated in 1966; castle courtyard with mighty residential tower, bailey with partial moat
- On a byway of Landesstraße 203, going towards Mastershausen – basalt wayside cross, marked 1775
- At the Landesstraße 204/Kreisstraße 30 crossroads – cast-iron wayside cross, 19th century
- On Landesstraße 203 southwest of Buch on a ridge – chapel; quarrystone building, marked 1878
- On Landesstraße 204 east of Buch – sandstone wayside cross

==== Mörz ====
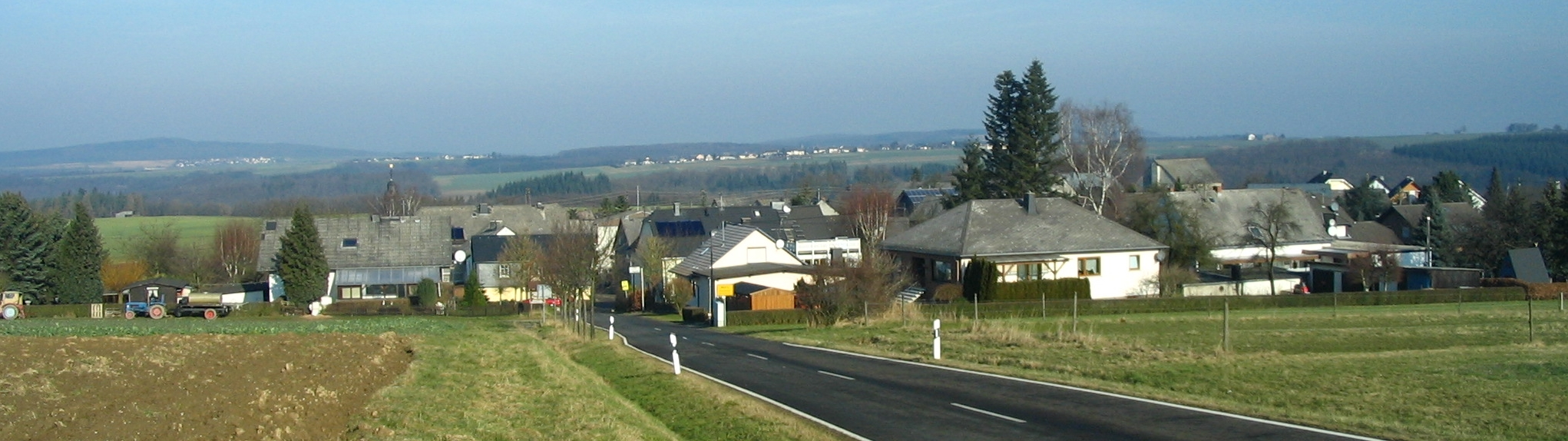
View of Mörz from the south

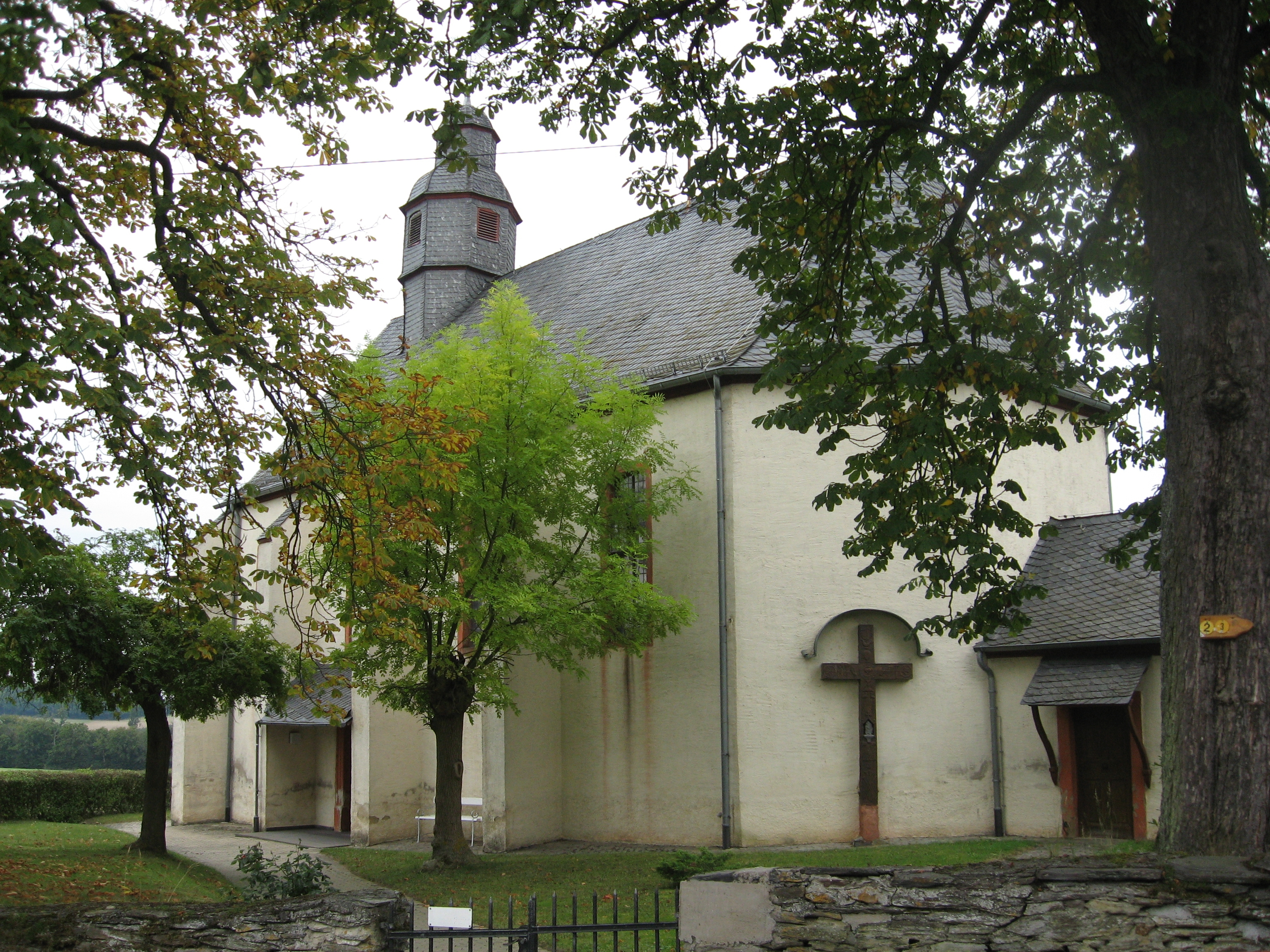
Mörz, Hauptstraße 13: Catholic Church of the Assumption

- Catholic Church of the Assumption (Katholische Kirche Mariä Himmelfahrt), Hauptstraße 13 – aisleless church, marked 1735/1736, with parts of walls from the foregoing mediaeval building, conversion possibly in 1783; old graveyard, two grave crosses, marked 1771 and 1717; wooden cross, marked 1814; whole complex of buildings
- North of the village – Sabelsmühle; three-floor mill building, partly quarrystone or partly slated timber framing, stable, barn, 1848; whole complex of buildings with bridge
- West of Mörz – grave cross; Rheinböllen Ironworks, latter half of the 19th century

== Notable people ==
- Cláudio Cardinal Hummes, Roman Catholic theologian and Archbishop of São Paulo
