= Kastellaun =

- Town
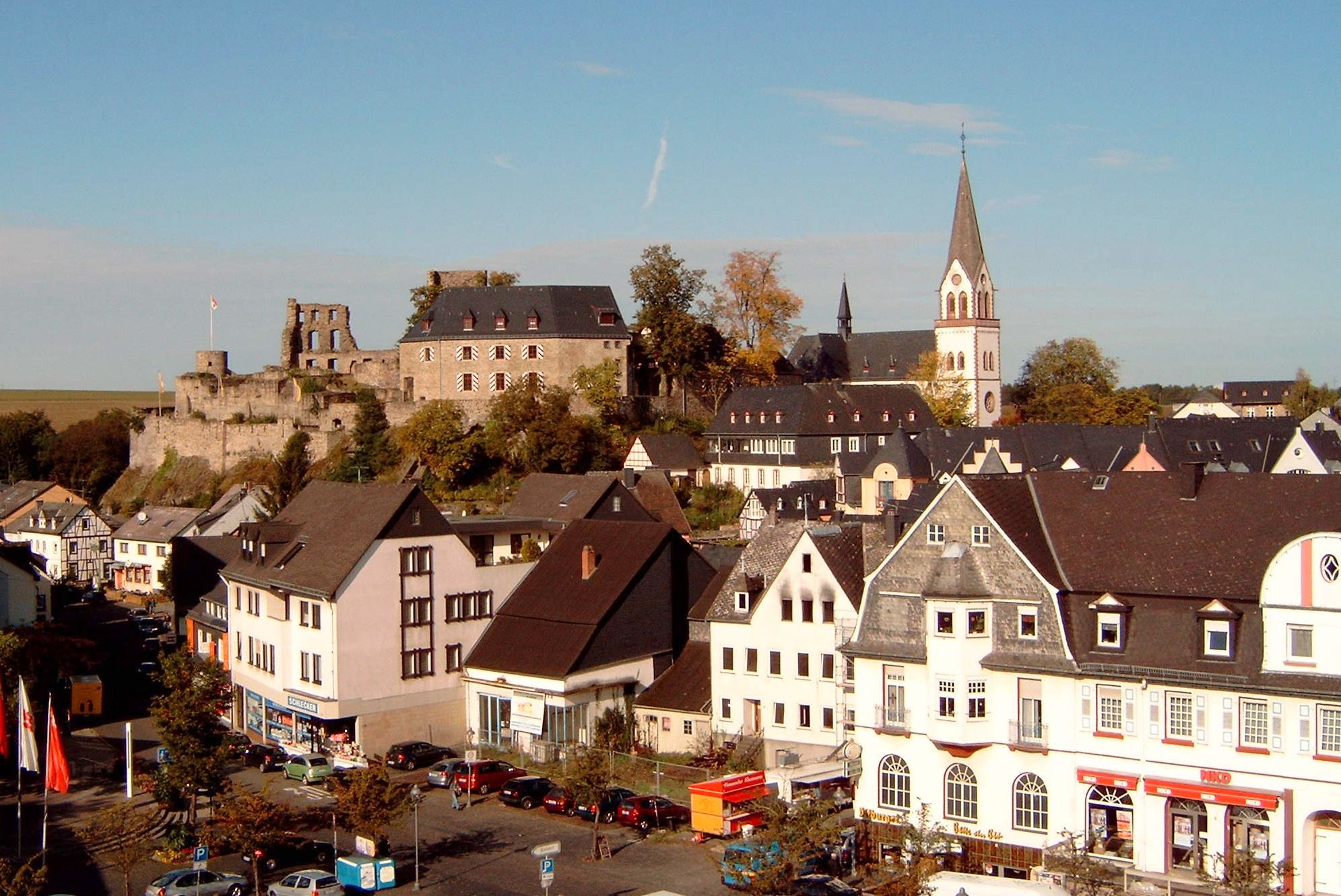
- Market square and castle

- Coat of arms

- Location of Kastellaun within Rhein-Hunsrück-Kreis district
- Interactive map of Kastellaun
- Location within Germany Location within Rhineland-Palatinate
- Coordinates: 50°4′10″N 7°26′35″E
- Country: Germany
- State: Rhineland-Palatinate
- District: Rhein-Hunsrück-Kreis
- Municipal assoc.: Kastellaun

Government
  - Mayor (2019–24): Christian Keimer

Area
  - Total: 8.47 km^{2} (3.27 sq mi)
- Elevation: 430 m (1,410 ft)

Population (2025-12-31)
  - Total: 5,732
  - Density: 677/km^{2} (1,750/sq mi)
- Time zone: UTC+01:00 (CET)
  - Summer (DST): UTC+02:00 (CEST)
- Postal codes: 56288
- Dialling codes: 06762
- Vehicle registration: SIM
- Website: https://www.kastellaun.de/

Kastellaun (German pronunciation: [kastɛˈlaʊn]) is a town in the Rhein-Hunsrück-Kreis (district) in Rhineland-Palatinate, Germany. It is the seat of the like-named Verbandsgemeinde, a kind of collective municipality.

== Geography ==
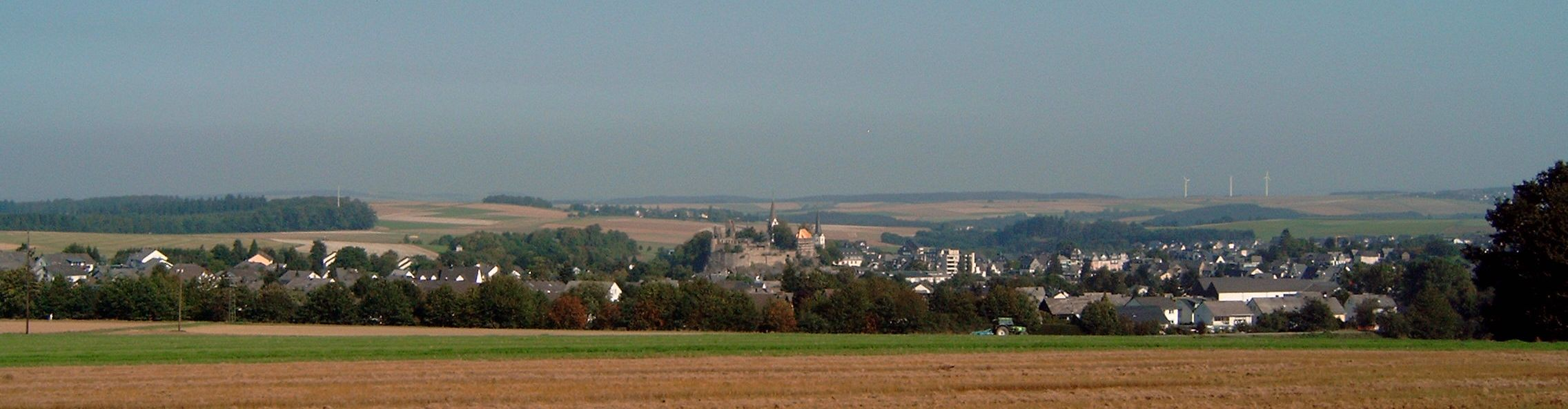
View of Kastellaun from the south

=== Location ===
The town lies in the eastern Hunsrück roughly equidistant from the Moselle, the Rhine and the Nahe. The town centre lies between a depression in the north and the plateau of the Hunsrück, over which runs Bundesstraße 327, the so-called Hunsrückhöhenstraße (“Hunsrück Heights Road”, a scenic road across the Hunsrück built originally as a military road on Hermann Göring’s orders).

=== Climate ===
Yearly precipitation in Kastellaun amounts to 755 mm, which falls into the middle third of the precipitation chart for all Germany. At 53% of the German Weather Service's weather stations, lower figures recorded. The driest month is April. The most rainfall comes in June. In that month, precipitation is 1.4 times what it is in April. Precipitation varies only slightly and is spread very evenly throughout the year. Only at 1% of the weather stations are lower seasonal swings recorded.

== History ==
Kestilun was first mentioned in writing in 1226. The castle was built by the Counts of Sponheim and, until 1417, belonged to the County of Sponheim.

In 1301, the castle and the town became home to Simon II, Count of Sponheim-Kreuznach and his wife Elisabeth. Count Simon granted Kastellaun town rights in 1305 and also secured market rights on 8 November 1309 from Emperor Henry VII, who was the brother of Baldwin of Luxembourg, Archbishop of Trier. In 1321, the castle and the town found themselves under siege from Baldwin, who in 1325 also built another castle at Buch, Burg Balduinseck, to counter Kastellaun's challenges to his authority. In 1340, Count Walram of Sponheim left Kastellaun and went to Bad Kreuznach.

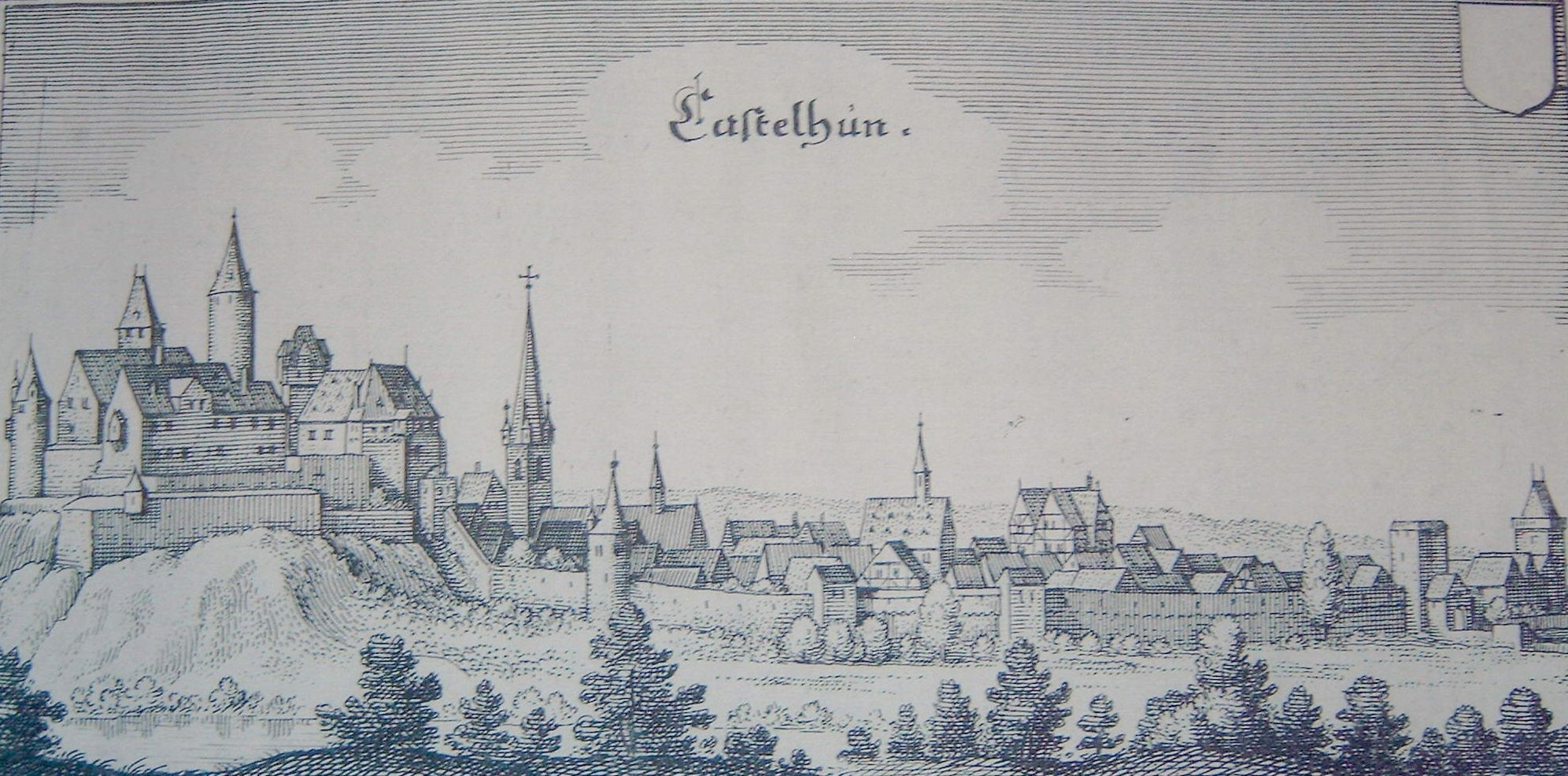
Mediaeval view of Kastellaun

In 1437, the Counts of Sponheim died out, and the inheritance fell with the Amt of Kastellaun to Stephen, Count Palatine of Simmern-Zweibrücken and the Lord of Baden, who ruled it jointly. Frederick I acquired the Principality of Simmern and a share of the County of Sponheim from the Veldenz legacy, which he ruled, after the last Count of Veldenz had died, from Kastellaun. He was therefore the actual founder of the Palatinate-Simmern line. Frederick I and his brother Louis divided their father's holdings between them once again in 1459. Louis got the Duchy of Zweibrücken and Frederick resided in Simmern. The Palatinate-Simmern share of the County of Sponheim passed in 1560 to the Count Palatine Zweibrücken and in 1569 to Palatinate-Birkenfeld under Zweibrücken hegemony.

Living at the castle until 1594 were various bailiffs (Amtmänner) who represented the joint lords’ (the County of Veldenz, the Margraviate of Baden, Palatinate-Simmern and Palatinate-Zweibrücken) interests. Margrave Edward Fortunatus was driven out of Baden-Baden in 1594 and sought refuge at the castle, thereby making it a residence once again. In the course of the Thirty Years' War (1618–1648), the town was occupied by Spaniards, Swedes, Lorrains, Hessians and Frenchmen. Great Plague epidemics raged.

The Sponheim lordship began to come to an end in 1687 as many parts of the Rhine's left bank were being occupied by Louis XIV's troops in the Nine Years' War (known in Germany as the Pfälzischer Erbfolgekrieg, or War of the Palatine Succession). The main result of the occupation for Kastellaun was the castle's and the town's destruction. In 1776, the joint lordship ended definitively, and the Amt and town of Kastellaun passed to Palatinate-Zweibrücken.

During the French Revolutionary Wars, the region was occupied in 1793 and 1794 by French troops and in 1798 it was assigned to the Department of Rhin-et-Moselle, thereby making it French until the Congress of Vienna in 1815. Then, Kastellaun became part of the Prussian Rhine Province.

In 1820, the castle passed into private ownership. In 1884, the town bought the property and gave the ruin its first renovation.

Since 1946, Kastellaun has been part of the then newly founded state of Rhineland-Palatinate. On 14 September 1969, it was granted town rights once again.

The castle hill and the ruins underwent renovation and restoration once again between 1990 and 1993. In 1999, the first castle house was rebuilt, followed by a second in 2005. On 9 September 2007, a documentation centre was dedicated as the “House of Regional History”.

== Politics ==
=== Town council ===
The council is made up of 22 council members, who were elected by proportional representation at the municipal election held on 7 June 2009, and the honorary mayor as chairman.

The municipal election held on 7 June 2009 yielded the following results:

	SPD	CDU	FDP	FWG	Total
2009	6	9	1	6	22 seats
2004	6	10	–	6	22 seats

=== Mayor ===
Kastellaun's mayor is Christian Keimer.

=== Coat of arms ===
The town's arms might be described thus: Sable a fess countercompony gules and argent, in chief two crowns in fess Or.

The arms recall those formerly borne by the Counts of Sponheim, which featured a “chequy” pattern. The two crowns are said to symbolize two of the counts who held sway here. These arms appear on the town seal as early as the 15th century.

In the 1920s, Otto Hupp showed a somewhat different coat of arms for Kastellaun in the Coffee Hag albums, with azure (blue) as the field tincture instead of sable (black), and with 14 squares of alternating tinctures on the fess (horizontal stripe) instead of 12. The composition of charges, however, was otherwise the same as in the arms borne now.

=== Town partnerships ===
Kastellaun fosters partnerships with the following places:

- Prémery, Nièvre, France

== Culture and sightseeing ==
=== Buildings ===
The following are listed buildings or sites in Rhineland-Palatinate’s Directory of Cultural Monuments:

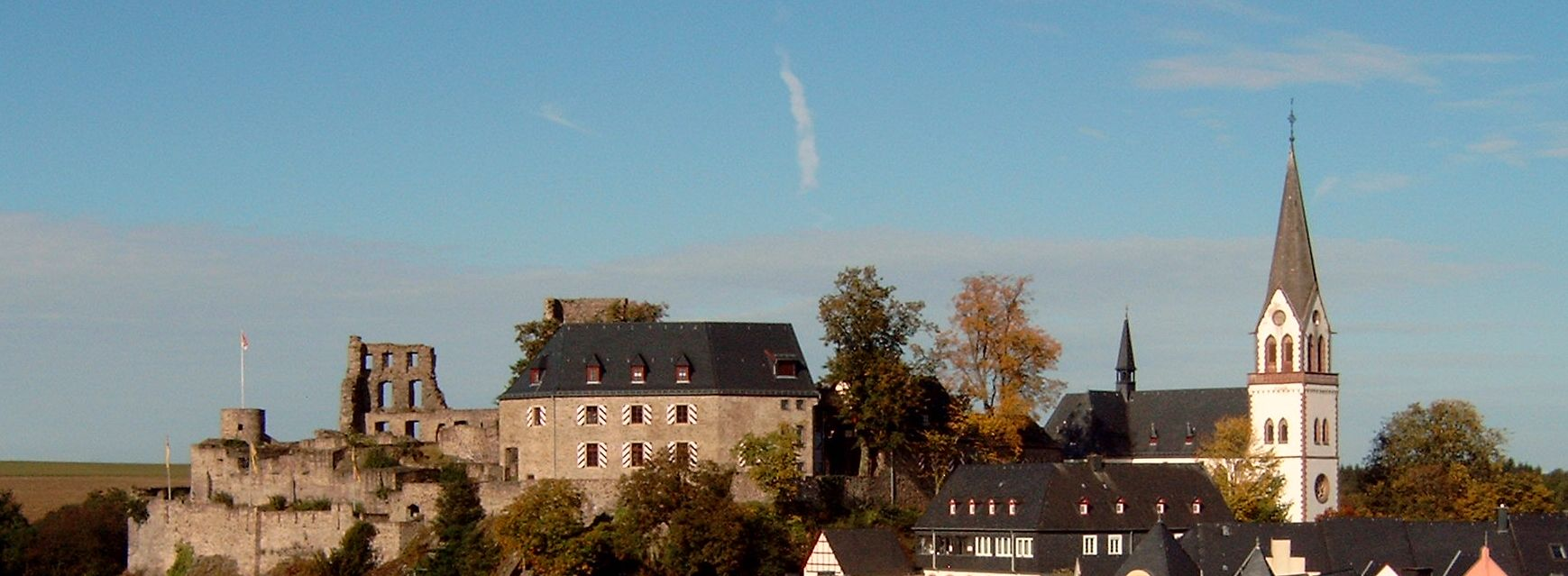
Castle Kastellaun monumental zone

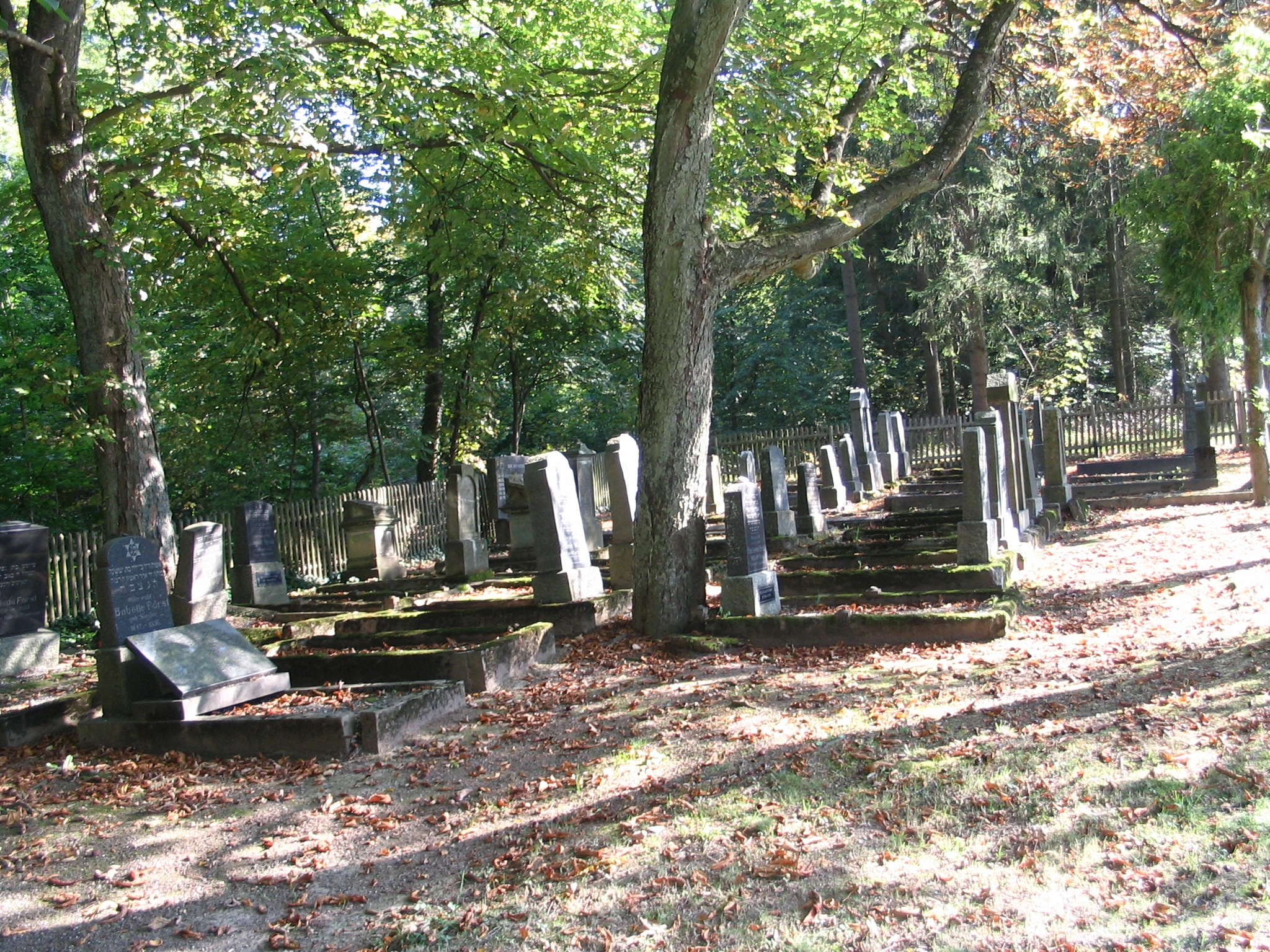
Jewish graveyard monumental zone

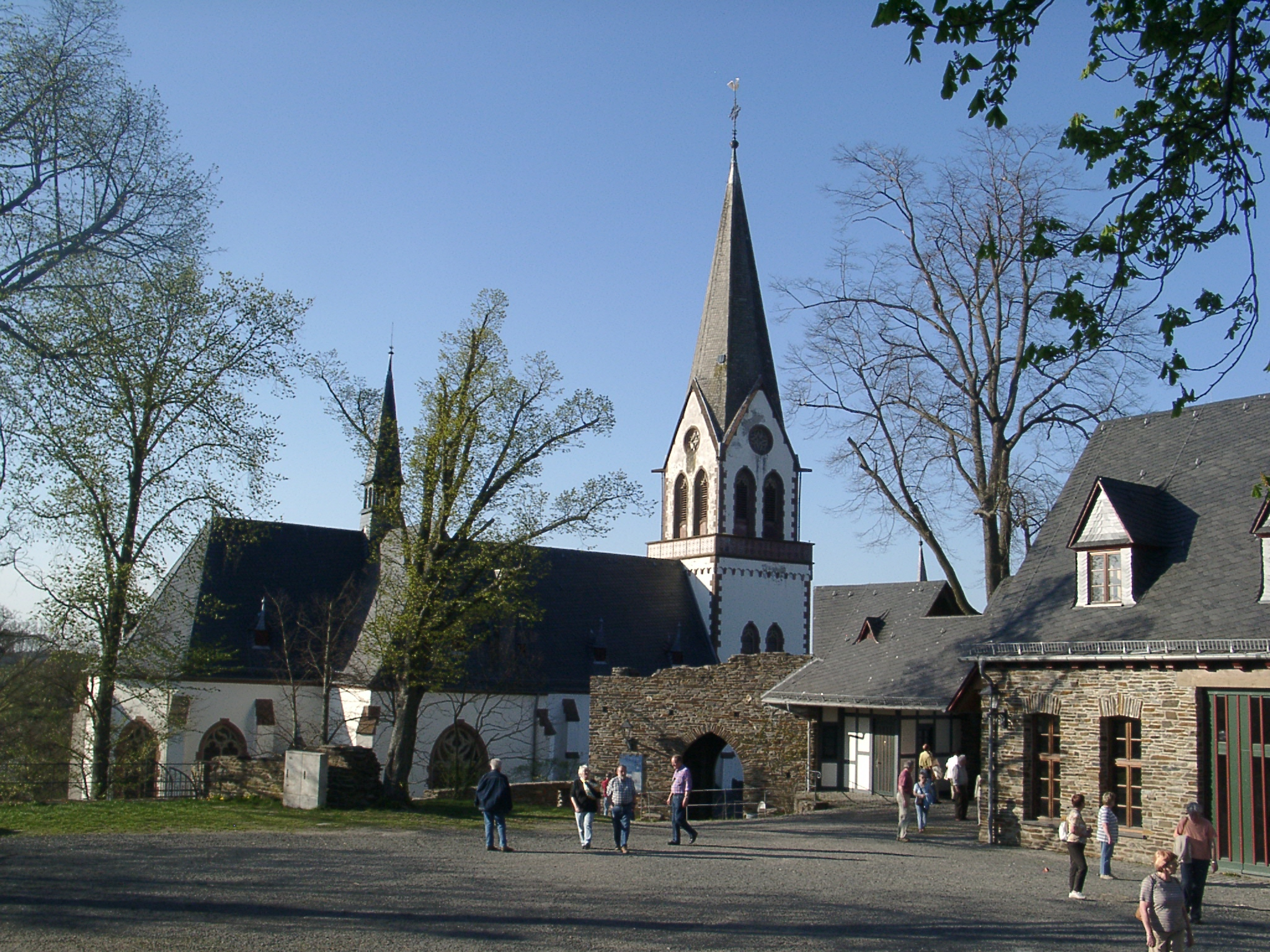
Schloßstraße 17: Catholic Church of the Holy Cross

- Castle Kastellaun ruin (monumental zone) – ruin of the wedge-shaped complex founded in the early 14th century and destroyed in 1689 with upper and lower castle; lodging building with, in places, three-floor-high west wall and the west half of the adjoining rectangular tower, both with arch friezes; rectangular building attested by digs; keep; on the site of the lower castle the Catholic Church
- Evangelical church, Kirchplatz 4 – triple nave, earlier half of the 14th century; tower possibly from the earlier half of the 14th century; quire, 15th century
- Catholic Church of the Holy Cross (Kirche zum Hl. Kreuz), Schloßstraße 17 – Gothic Revival basilica, 1899–1902, architect Eduard Endler, Cologne
- Town fortifications – Parts of walls from the former trapezoidal town fortifications, possibly from the earlier half of the 14th century; preserved, a stretch of wall along the backs of the houses on Burgweg and west of the Evangelical church; at Burgweg 6 a reconstructed gate; parts of a wall in the back parts of Eifelstraße 13 and 15, beside those reconstructed wall with parapet walk; remnants of a tower and a gateway arch near Marktstraße 14; parallel to Marktstraße and below the Evangelical church parts of the moat on the north side
- Bahnhofstraße 17 – two-winged Renaissance Revival building, about 1900
- Bahnhofstraße 23 – villa, pyramidal roof, about 1920
- Bahnhofstraße 38 – stately building with hipped roof with Expressionist portal, marked 1922
- Bahnhofstraße 54 – detached house, partly timber-frame, marked 1921
- Bopparder Straße 11 – building with hipped roof, marked 1808
- Bucher Straße 10 – former parish church (Pfarrkirche Hl. Kreuz); aisleless church, 1728; graveyard: graveyard cross, 1858; two grave crosses, 18th century, three basalt grave crosses, 19th century; five cast-iron grave crosses, Rheinböllen Ironworks, late 19th century; whole complex of buildings
- Burgweg 8 – former Catholic school; Late Classicist slate quarrystone building, shortly before 1845
- Burgweg 10 – timber-frame house, partly solid, plastered, 18th century, timber-frame addition
- Kirchstraße 13/15 – timber-frame house, half-hipped roof, 17th century
- Kirchstraße 17 – broadly seated half-hipped roof, partly timber-frame, plastered, about 1700
- Beside Marktstraße 14 – town wall gateway arch, marked 1747; town wall tower
- Marktstraße 14 – two-winged, three-floor timber-frame house, partly solid and slated, marked 1755, expansion/alterations in the 19th century
- Marktstraße 16 – timber-frame house, plastered, rich stucco, caryatids, about 1890
- Marktstraße 17 – former hotel “Zum Schwanen”; timber-frame house, partly solid, hipped mansard roof, possibly from the 17th century
- Marktstraße 22 – former Scharfensteiner Hof; three-floor timber-frame house, partly solid and slated, hipped mansard roof, marked 1724
- Schloßstraße 5a – timber-frame house, partly solid, mansard roof, possibly from the early 18th century
- Schloßstraße 7 – timber-frame house, partly solid, plastered, mansard roof, early 19th century
- Schloßstraße 10 – former Catholic rectory; building with hipped mansard roof, 18th century
- Schloßstraße 11 – former financial office of the Margraves of Baden and the Dukes of Palatine Zweibrücken; today a Catholic rectory, two-winged timber-frame house, partly solid and slated, about 1700
- Schloßstraße 15 – former tithe barn; one-floor building with hipped mansard roof, 18th century
- Schloßstraße 19 – former Badish Amt winery; building with hipped mansard roof, marked 1670
- Jewish graveyard, Hasselbacher Straße (monumental zone) – founded about 1879, 37 grave steles from 1885 to 1933
- warriors’ memorial 1870/1871, Am Pfingstwald – sandstone obelisk

=== Sport and leisure ===
On the town's southeastern outskirts is found an indoor swimming pool with an integrated medical rehabilitation centre, and a sport and fitness area. Right nearby is a miniature golf course.

The Kyrill Path was established in May 2008, after the Kyrill storm laid waste to woodlands in 2007. Along the 800 m-long path leading through 1.5 ha of woodland devastated by the storm, the visitor can get an idea of the destruction wrought by the Kyrill storm and also learn something about the regeneration of new forest. Ten information stations deal in detail with geology, pedology, root development, climate, weather, life in dead wood, the bark beetle’s voraciousness, natural and artificial forest rejuvenation, mechanized wood harvesting and modern forestry.

Near the Kyrill Path, a ropes course and a barefoot path were opened in May 2008.

Along Kastellaun’s southern outskirts, along the old Hunsrückbahn (railway) right-of-way, runs the Schinderhannes-Radweg (cycle path). This begins in Simmern and leads by Kastellaun on the way to Emmelshausen.

Near Kastellaun lies the former Pydna Missile Base, where each year, an open-air electronic music festival called Nature One is held.

Among the many clubs, there is the Kastellaun Gymnastics Club (Turnverein Kastellaun), part of the widely known Kastellaun-Simmern Handball Playing Association (Handballspielgemeinschaft Kastellaun-Simmern).

== Economy and infrastructure ==
=== Education ===
Located in Kastellaun are one primary school, an Integrierte Gesamtschule (IGS; a comprehensive school that combines Hauptschule, Realschule and Gymnasium streams) with a gymnasial upper level, the Theodor Heuss School for the Mentally Handicapped/School for the Physically Handicapped and the Kastellaun Free Waldorf School.

=== Other institutions ===
The Julius-Reuß-Wohnheim is an institution geared to help people with disabilities. It is among the so-called Schmiedelanstalten (roughly “Swamp Institutions” – named for the wetland area where they were originally found; Julius Reuß was their founder) and is located in a residential neighbourhood between the town centre and the industrial park. It collaborates with the other institutions in town dedicated to care of the handicapped, namely the Theodor Heuss Schools mentioned above along with their special kindergarten for children with mental disabilities, the workshop and the daytime assistance centre at the Rhein-Mosel-Werkstätten (“Rhine-Moselle Workshops”) and the home of the club Betreutes Wohnen Hunsrück e.V. (“Hunsrück Assisted Living”) for those with physical illnesses.

=== Tourism ===
The town takes it upon itself to promote tourism. On offer are guided tours through the Old Town and to the castle ruins. The most important buildings and sites and historical events from the castle's and the town's history are described and explained on these tours by expert guides. The small, traditional Bell Leisure Park lies right nearby.

Kastellaun lies on the Deutsche Alleenstraße (Germany's longest themed holiday road, featuring many Alleen – tree-lined avenues).

=== Bundeswehr post ===
Kastellaun has been home since 20 March 1964 to a Bundeswehr barracks, which houses Command Support Battalion (Führungsunterstützungsbataillon) 282.

== Famous people ==
=== Notable people born in the town ===
- Philipp Christoph Reichsritter von Sötern (1567–1652), Archbishop and Elector of Trier
- Eberhard Kieser (b. 2. December 1583 in Kastellaun; d. November 1631 in Frankfurt) German engraver and publisher
- Arnold Constantin Peter Franz von Lasaulx (b. 14 June 1839; d. 25 January 1886) German mineralogist and petrographer
- Heinrich Friedrich Zimmer (1851–1910), Celticist and Indologist; first German professor of Celtic studies

=== Other notable people associated with the town ===
- Simon II, Count of Sponheim-Kreuznach (c. 1270-1336)
- Edward Fortunatus (1565–1600), Regent of the Margraviate of Baden-Baden, died at Castle Kastellaun
