= Nature One =

Electronic music festival

Coordinates: 50°02′36″N 7°25′21″E

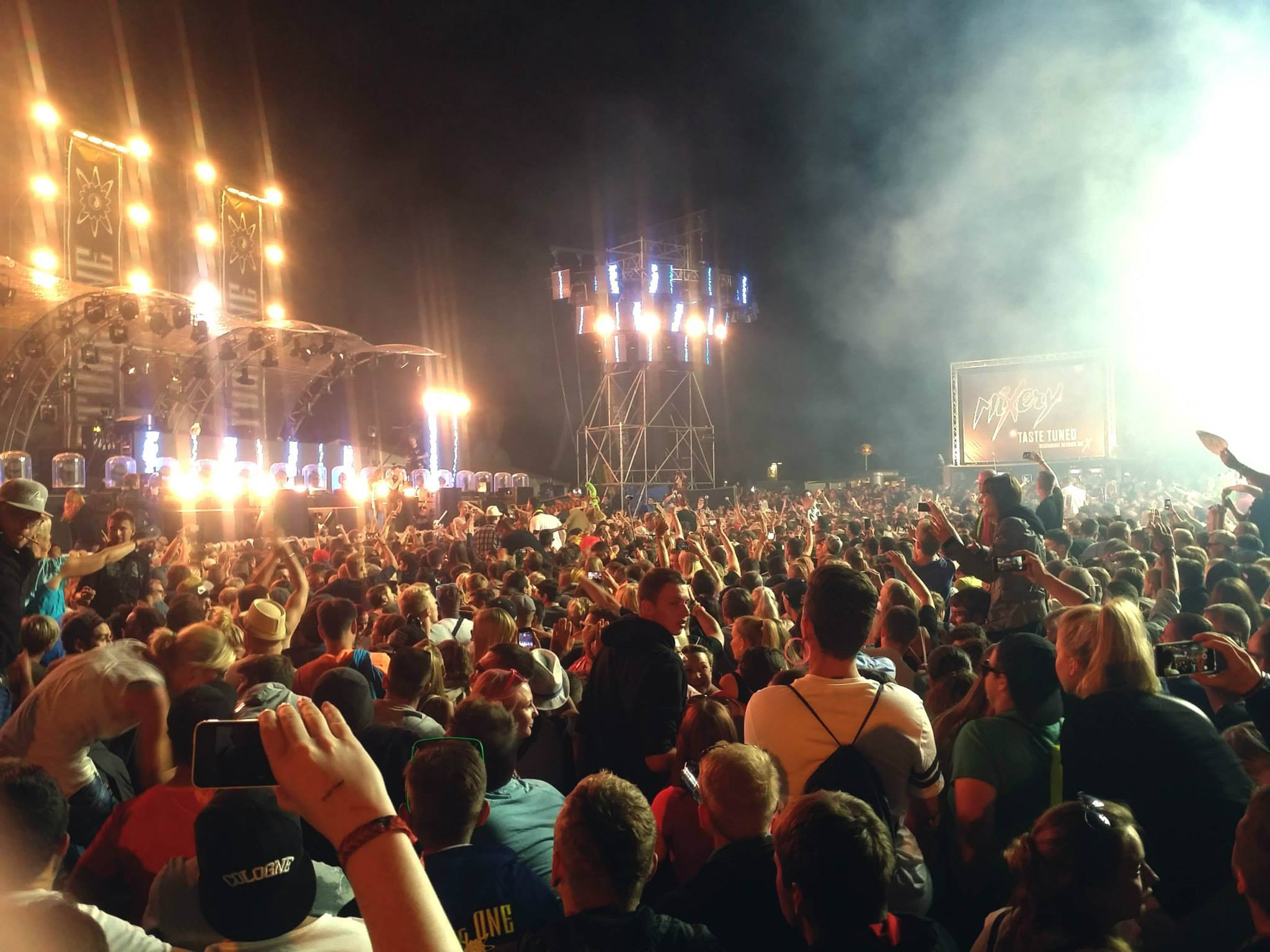
- Open Air Floor at Nature One 2015
- Genre: Techno; trance; minimal; hardcore; hardtechno; EDM
- Dates: First weekend in August
- Locations: Missile base Pydna near Kastellaun, Germany
- Years active: 1995–present
- Website: nature-one.de

Nature One is one of the largest European open-air electronic music festivals, featuring many renowned DJs from Germany and all over the world.

== Overview ==
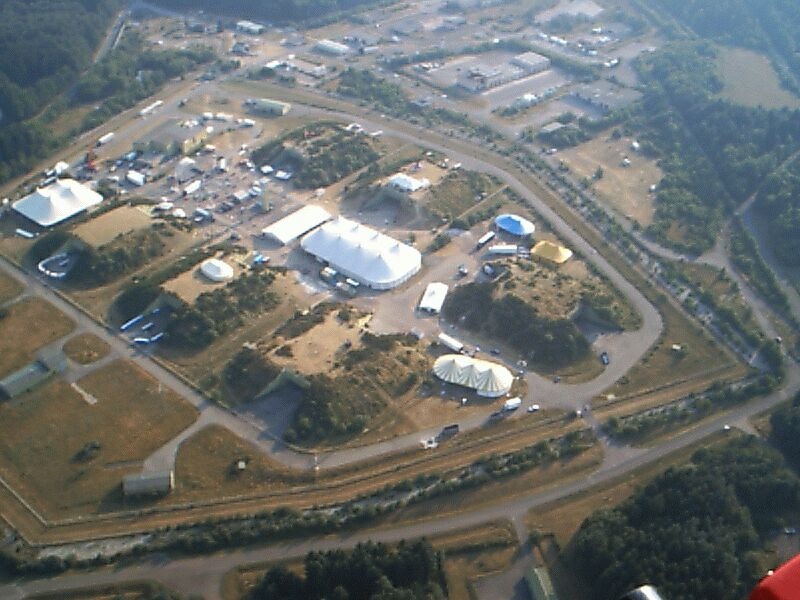
Pydna during Nature One 2003

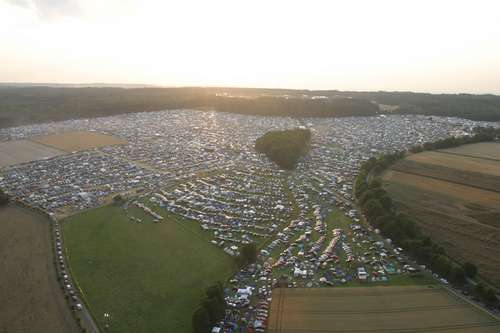
Nature One 2004 camping grounds

Nature One tickets cost approximately 70 euros (as of 2010). The festival lasts for one long weekend each year always on the first weekend of August. There is a fireworks display on Saturday evening.

In 2004 the festival had an attendance of roughly 53,000, with over 40,000 camping in nearby fields. The camping ground is effectively a second festival, with many hobby DJs and some commercially organized trucks, loaded with generators and fuel, rivaling small clubs with turntables, loudspeakers and lighting. Some people attend only the campsite as an alternative festival weekend.

The festival itself is structured into four "main floors" each for a few thousand:

- Open Air Floor (mostly Trance)
- Century Circus (Techno)
- House of House (House, Minimal)
- Classic Terminal

There are also a few smaller areas (in 2012, there are 18 smaller areas), sometimes occupied by techno club crews for a few hundred attendees. The site is a decommissioned US missile base called "Pydna", providing infrastructure and 100,000 m^{2} space (without camping, which takes up more than 1 km^{2}).

Since 2002 Nature One is supported by eve&rave Münster e.V. with drug-information desks.

== Past and future Nature One ==
Date	Theme	Number of acts	Miscellaneous	Attendance (estimated)
26 August 1995	"Open Air Rave"	38 DJs and live acts	at Frankfurt-Hahn Airport	13,000
17 August 1996	"Open Air 96"	40 DJs and live acts	moves to Pydna missile base	15,000
1–3 August 1997	"The Festival"	70 DJs and live acts	First camping grounds 6,000 campers turn Nature One into a true "festival"	20,000
31 July – 2 August 1998	"Festival 98"	125 DJs and live acts	7 techno/house clubs build up their floors at Nature One; 10,000+ campers	25,000
30 July – 1 August 1999	"Festival 99"	178 DJs and live acts	18,000 campers 11 clubs floors	30,000
28–30 July 2000	"Sound of Love"	211 DJs and live acts	festival extends to a warm-up party on Thursday; 16 club floors	36,000
3–5 August 2001	"Super Natural"	250 DJs and live acts	16 club floors	40,000
2–4 August 2002	"Summer Sound System"	228 DJs and live acts	35,000 campers	45,000
1–3 August 2003	"Alive & Kickin'"	217 DJs and live acts	40,000 campers 16 club floors	50,000
30 July – 1 August 2004	"The Golden 10"	275 DJs and live acts	40,000 campers 16 club floors	52,000
5–7 August 2005	"Mission to future"	300 DJs and live acts	18 club floors	48,000
4–6 August 2006	"Live your passion"	300 DJs and live acts	18 club floors	45,000
3–5 August 2007	"Das dreizehnte Land"	300 DJs and live acts	16 club floors	50,000
1–3 August 2008	"Wake Up In Yellow"	300 DJs and live acts	festival area extends by 20,000 m^{2} 17 club floors	58,000
31 July – 2 August 2009	"Smile is the answer"	300 DJs and live acts	18 club floors	61,000
30 July – 1 August 2010	"The Flag Keeps Flying"	300 DJs and live acts	18 club floors	55,000
5–7 August 2011	"Go Wild – Freak Out"	300 DJs and live acts	18 club floors	54,000
3–5 August 2012	"YOU. ARE. STAR"	300 DJs and live acts	18 club floors	56,000
2–4 August 2013	"a time to shine"	300 DJs and live acts	18 club floors	64,000
1–3 August 2014	"The Golden 20"	350 DJs and live acts	19 club floors	72,000
31 July – 2 August 2015	"stay as you are"	376 DJs and live acts	19 club floors	65,000
5–7 August 2016	"red dancing flames"	300 DJs and live acts	19 club floors	65,000
4–6 August 2017	"we call it home"	350 DJs and live acts	23 club floors	56,000
3–5 August 2018	"all you need to be"	350 DJs and live acts	23 club floors	54,000
2–4 August 2019	"The Twenty Five"	350 DJs and live acts	22 club floors	65,000
5–7 August 2022	"like nowhere else"	350 DJs and live acts	22 club floors	60,000
4–6 August 2023	"where we belong"	350 DJs and live acts	22 club floors	65,000
1–4 August 2024	"full of life"	350 DJs and live acts	22 club floors	50,000
31 July–3 August 2025	"Celebrating Thirty Years"	350 DJs and live acts	22 club floors	65,000
30 July–2 August 2026				

== Awards ==
- Dance Music Award
  - 2003: in the category "Best Event"
- The Helga Festival Award (from Festivalguide)
  - 2013: in the category "Best Festival National" (Audience Award)

== See also ==
- List of electronic music festivals
