= Pydna (missile base) =

Former American missile base in Germany

Coordinates: 50°02′38″N 7°25′32″E

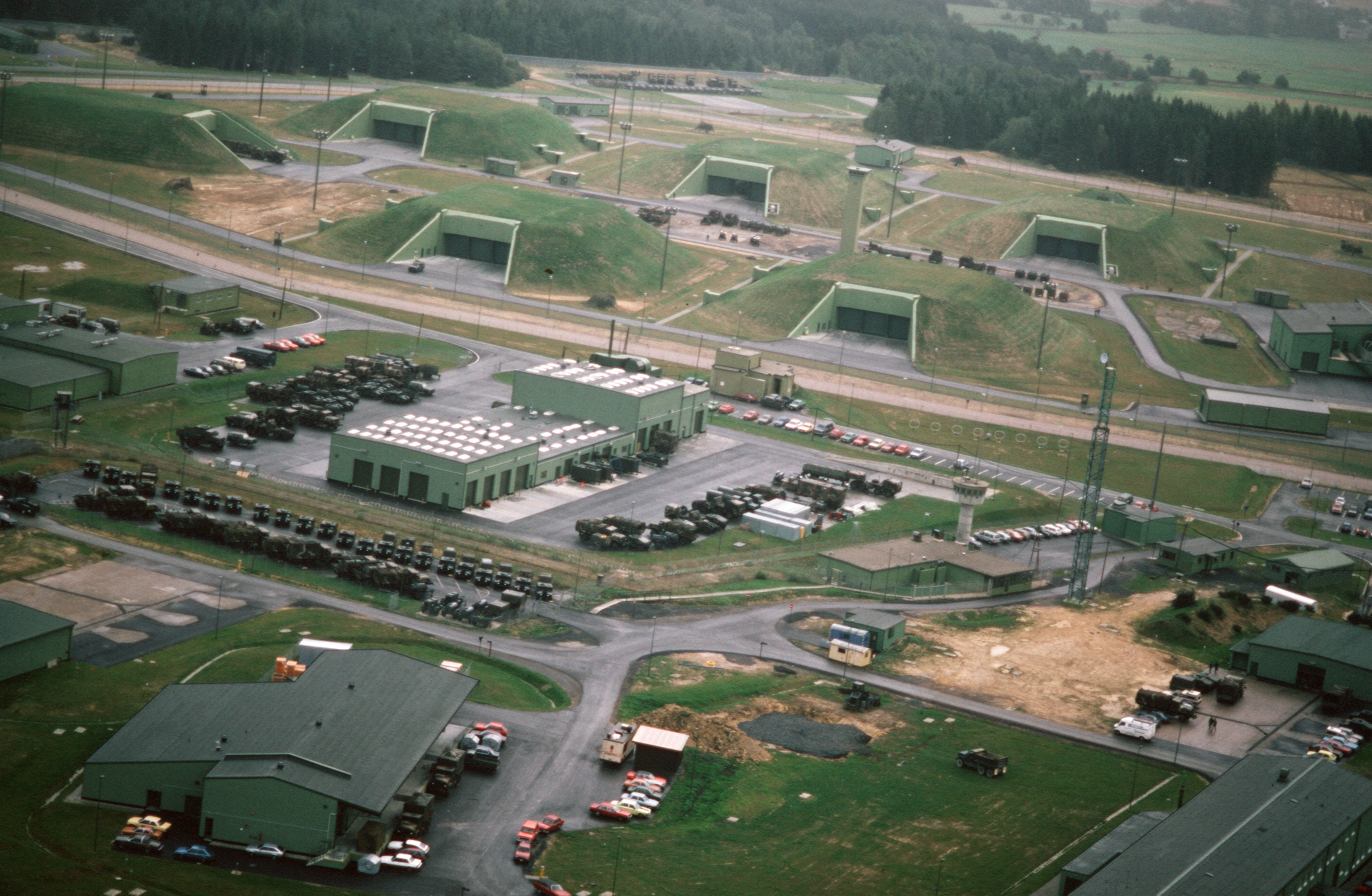
Wüschheim Air Station with six Ready Storage Shelter (RSS) for Transporter-Erector-Launcher (TEL) with BGM-109G Ground Launched Cruise Missile

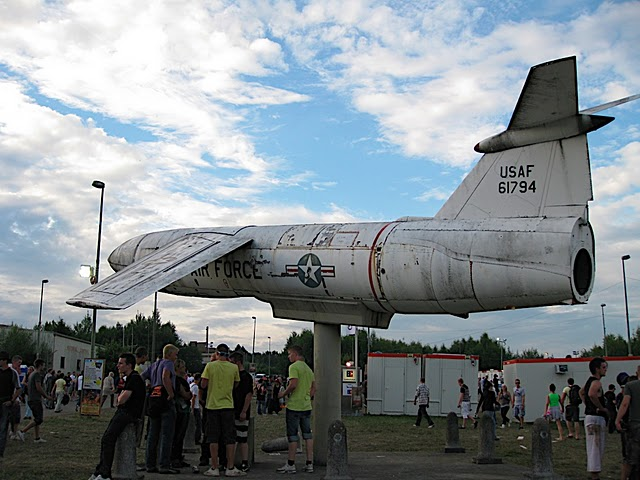
Matador missile at the entrance of Pydna during Nature One

Pydna is a former American missile base in Kastellaun, Germany named Wueschheim Air Station.

Nuclear-equipped MGM-1 Matador, MGM-13 Mace, MIM-14 Nike Hercules and BGM-109G Ground Launched Cruise Missiles were stationed here.

Since 1995, the site has hosted the Nature One open-air electronic music festival.

Festival facilities now use the same bunkers that were once home to 64 Ground-Launched Cruise Missiles (GLCM) (BGM-109), Tactical Nuclear Missiles, under the operational control of the 38th Tactical Missile Wing of the United States Air Force.
