= Bell, Rhein-Hunsrück =

Bell
- Municipality
- Coat of arms

- Location of Bell within Rhein-Hunsrück-Kreis district
- Interactive map of Bell
- Location within Germany Location within Rhineland-Palatinate
- Coordinates: 50°3′43.40″N 7°24′53.65″E
- Country: Germany
- State: Rhineland-Palatinate
- District: Rhein-Hunsrück-Kreis
- Municipal assoc.: Kastellaun

Government
  - Mayor (2019–24): Manfred Kochems

Area
  - Total: 23.53 km^{2} (9.08 sq mi)
- Elevation: 420 m (1,380 ft)

Population (2025-12-31)
  - Total: 1,469
  - Density: 62.43/km^{2} (161.7/sq mi)
- Time zone: UTC+01:00 (CET)
  - Summer (DST): UTC+02:00 (CEST)
- Postal codes: 56288
- Dialling codes: 06762
- Vehicle registration: SIM
- Website: bell-hunsrueck.de

Bell (German pronunciation: [bɛl]) is an Ortsgemeinde – a municipality belonging to a Verbandsgemeinde, a kind of collective municipality – in the Rhein-Hunsrück-Kreis (district) in Rhineland-Palatinate, Germany. It belongs to the Verbandsgemeinde of Kastellaun, whose seat is in the like-named town.

== Geography ==
=== Location ===
The municipality lies in the Hunsrück. The main centre – there are six Ortsteile – with its 479 inhabitants (as at 30 June 2009) lies roughly one kilometre from Kastellaun and the Hunsrückhöhenstraße (“Hunsrück Heights Road”, a scenic road across the Hunsrück built originally as a military road on Hermann Göring’s orders) on the edge of the hollow where the streams rise that form the Mörsdorfer Bach, which flows down to Castle Balduinseck where it empties into the Flaumbach, itself a tributary to the Moselle.

=== Constituent communities ===
Bell’s Ortsteile are the main centre, also called Bell, and the outlying centres of Hundheim, Krastel, Leideneck, Wohnroth and Völkenroth along with the Blümlingshof and the Rothenberger Hof.

== History ==
In 1220, Bell had its first documentary mention in the directory of yearly payments to the Archbishopric of Trier, the liber annalium. Even so, Bell is a much older settlement. The name itself is pre-Germanic, being a Celtic word for a hill or a settlement in the heights. Grave finds near Bell, particularly the Wagon Grave of Bell from late Hallstatt times (about 500 BC), show that the area was settled by Celts.

A Roman estate east of the church discovered in the mid 19th century and certified as a “ground monument”, and a Frankish manor just to its south in the cadastral area “In den Hupfeldern” (whose name refers to this estate; foundations of this manor were unearthed when the land was opened to development) give one some clue as to the village's importance in the time when the Franks were taking over the land. Bell was also the main centre of a parish to which belonged Leideneck, Horn, Alterkülz and even the later castle and residence town of Kastellaun, now the seat of the Verbandsgemeinde. Neighbouring places with names ending in —heim and —bach (Hundheim, Michelbach) date from the time of the Frankish takeover (500–700) during the Migration Period (Völkerwanderung), and are therefore much younger than Bell. Places with names ending in —roth were established in the time of widespread woodland clearing in the Early Middle Ages. Bell also lay near the Celtic, later Roman, “high road”.

Only much later, in the High Middle Ages when it was under the lordship of the Counts of Sponheim, did Bell's name once again crop up in history: in 1305, Count Simon II granted Kastellaun, the little place at his castle, town rights, and obtained from Henry VII, Holy Roman Emperor, who was Archbishop-Elector of Trier Baldwin's brother, market rights as well, in 1308; the next year, though, Emperor Henry also granted Bell market rights.

=== Modern times ===
Bell bore its share of hardship and woe in the wars that swept across Europe through the ages. It was particularly bad in the Nine Years' War (known in Germany as the Pfälzischer Erbfolgekrieg, or War of the Palatine Succession) with King Louis XIV's policy of Réunions. Beginning in 1794, Bell lay under French rule. In 1815 it was assigned to the Kingdom of Prussia at the Congress of Vienna.

Late in the Second World War Bell was spared destruction when the Americans marched in on 13 March 1945 thanks to several local inhabitants and their clergyman, who courageously seized the initiative and hoisted a white flag on the churchtower.

Since 1946, Bell has been part of the then newly founded state of Rhineland-Palatinate.

Within the framework of the administrative reform in Rhineland-Palatinate begun in the mid-1960s, today's municipality was newly formed on 17 March 1974 out of what were until then the six separate municipalities of Bell (378 inhabitants), Hundheim (123), Krastel (173), Leideneck (233), Völkenroth (233) and Wohnroth (145).

=== Other centres’ first documentary mentions ===
Wohnroth had its first documentary mention in the directory of yearly payments to the Archbishopric of Trier, the liber annalium in 1220. The other outlying centres, though, were first mentioned 90 years later in a taxation register kept by the County of Sponheim.

=== Church history ===
With the introduction of the Reformation into the County in 1557, Kastellaun and Alterkülz, along with the municipalities that were dependent on them, became parochially autonomous. Leideneck split away in 1854 and thereafter shared a clergyman with Kappel, but since 1976, it has once more been parochially united with Bell. The last municipalities that left the parish of Bell were Spesenroth in 1926, which joined Kastellaun, and Hasselbach in 1947, which nowadays belongs to the parish of Alterkülz.

==== Bell Church ====
The church's age is not known for certain. The tower's Romanesque building style would mean that it comes from some time between the 11th and 13th centuries. The nave, however, is considerably newer. It was newly built from the ground up in 1728. The old rectory was built to replace an older one in 1716; it stood until 1959.

==== Bell’s bells ====
Worthy of note are the church's three bells. The oldest one, the kleine Maria (“Little Mary”) dates from 1313, and along with Sohren’s and Büchenbeuren’s bells is one of the oldest in the Hunsrück. Its diameter is 79 cm, its height is 77 cm and it weighs 250 kg.

The große Maria (“Great Mary”) was poured in 1459 by bellfounder Thilmann from Hachenburg. Its diameter is 126 cm, its height is 110 cm and it weighs 900 kg. In 1694, some of Louis XIV's soldiers stole this bell. A brave man from Bell named Braun ran after the soldiers and then had earnest words with their general, who relented and let Mr. Braun have the bell back. It turned out that Braun was not even Protestant; he was one of the village's few Catholics. As thanks for Mr. Braun's good deed, the Protestant Presbytery at that time decided that whenever a member of Mr. Braun's family or one of his descendants was buried, the bells at Bell's Protestant church – including the one that he had recovered – would peal to accompany them to their final resting place. Catholics otherwise had to make do with the bell at the town hall. This tradition was observed for the last time in 2005 when Mr. Albert Braun, the hero's last living descendant, died on 31 July of that year in Kastellaun.

The third bell in the churchtower was seized and melted down in the First World War. Its replacement, which was hung in 1928, suffered the same fate only 14 years later in the Second World War. The bell that hangs there now dates from 1957. Its diameter is 90 cm, its height is 88 cm and it weighs 441 kg. The whole village turned out to see the bell lifted from the street on a tight cable, up through one of the sound holes and into the belfry.

==== Eucharist chalice ====
The Eucharist chalice from 1483 bears the name “Steph’ de Bernkastel”, who was the priest at that time.

== Politics ==
=== Municipal council ===
The council is made up of 16 council members, who were elected at the municipal election held on 7 June 2009, and the honorary mayor as chairman.

=== Mayor ===
Bell's mayor is Manfred Kochems, elected in May 2019. Each of the municipality's six Ortsteile also has a head official with the title Ortsvorsteher, each of whom is also on municipal council.

=== Coat of arms ===
The municipality's arms might in English heraldic language be described thus: Azure in base a wall masoned sable of three courses upon which a shorter course of three bricks upon which a poplar tree eradicated, all argent, the whole below a chief countercompony gules and argent.

== Culture and sightseeing ==
=== Beller Markt ===
On the second-last Wednesday in July each year, Bell holds its traditional Beller Markt (market) on the market grounds on the Hunsrückhöhenstraße (Bundesstraße 327). The market, with its centuries-long tradition as a farmer's market and a livestock trading centre, is today a popular event for tourists and a meeting point for people from the whole region. It draws many thousands of visitors each year. On average, 400 sellers, showmen and restaurateurs offer guests a mixture of market dealing and fair attractions. Also, many local businesses take part.

=== Leisure and tourism ===
- Right next to the market grounds and the SG Bell sporting ground lies the small Freizeitpark Bell (“leisure park”), established in the 1970s. The principle of the small complex is that it was built “around nature”. Highlights here are the fairytale forest with moving figures, a petting zoo and simpler attractions. The park itself has its roots in the time when many German leisure parks were being established, and began, like others, with the fairytale forest. Although it is off the beaten tourist path, the park has economic importance for the local area.
- There is an indoor stage at the Bell-Vue inn where political and cultural events are held.
- Only a few hundred metres from Bell, at the former railway station, runs the Schinderhannes-Radweg (cycle path) on the old Hunsrückbahn (railway) right-of-way.

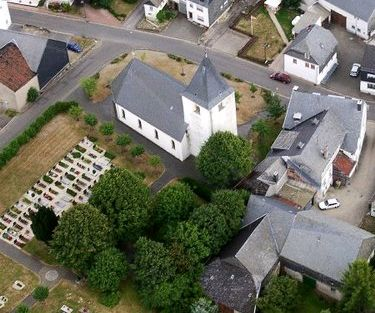
Bell (Hunsrück), Hauptstraße 5: Evangelical church

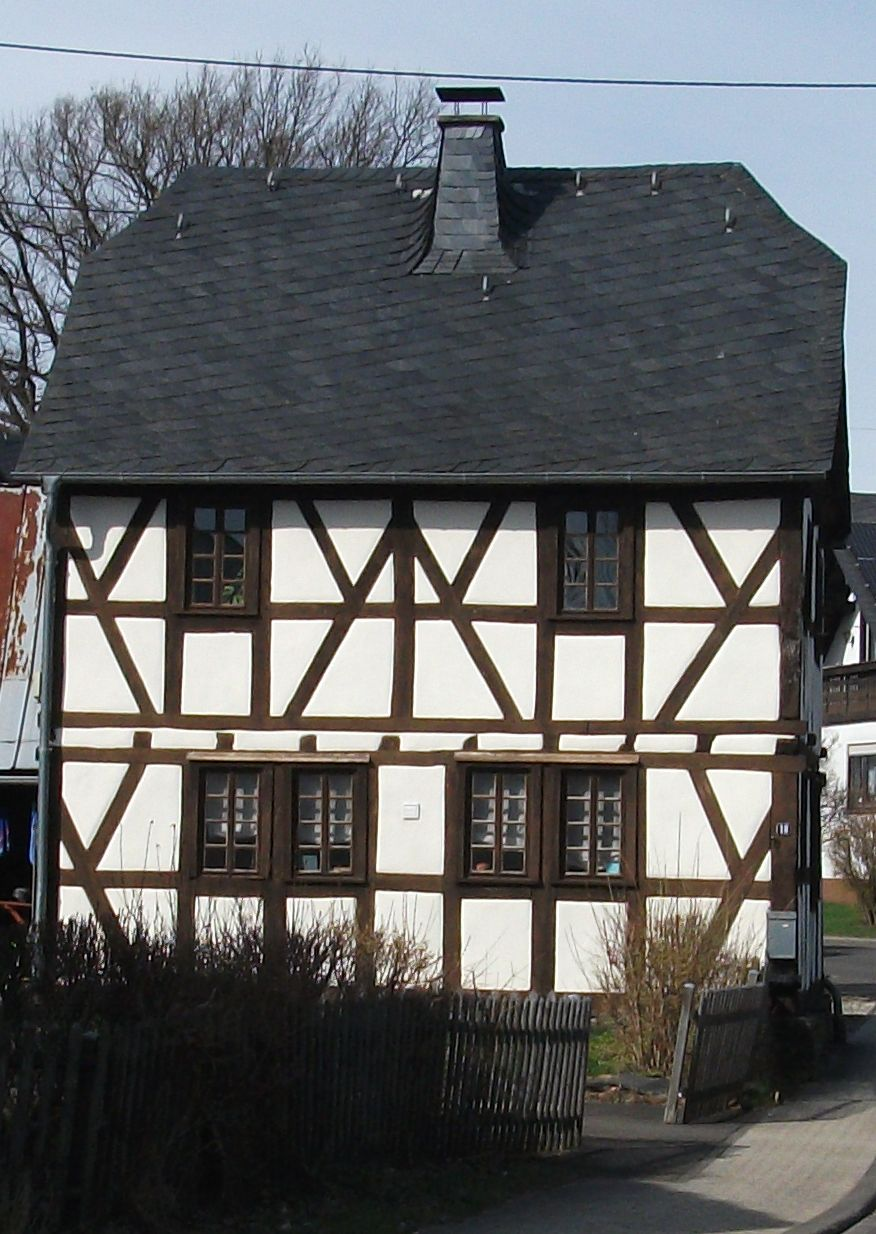
Hundheim, Dorfstraße 18: timber-frame house

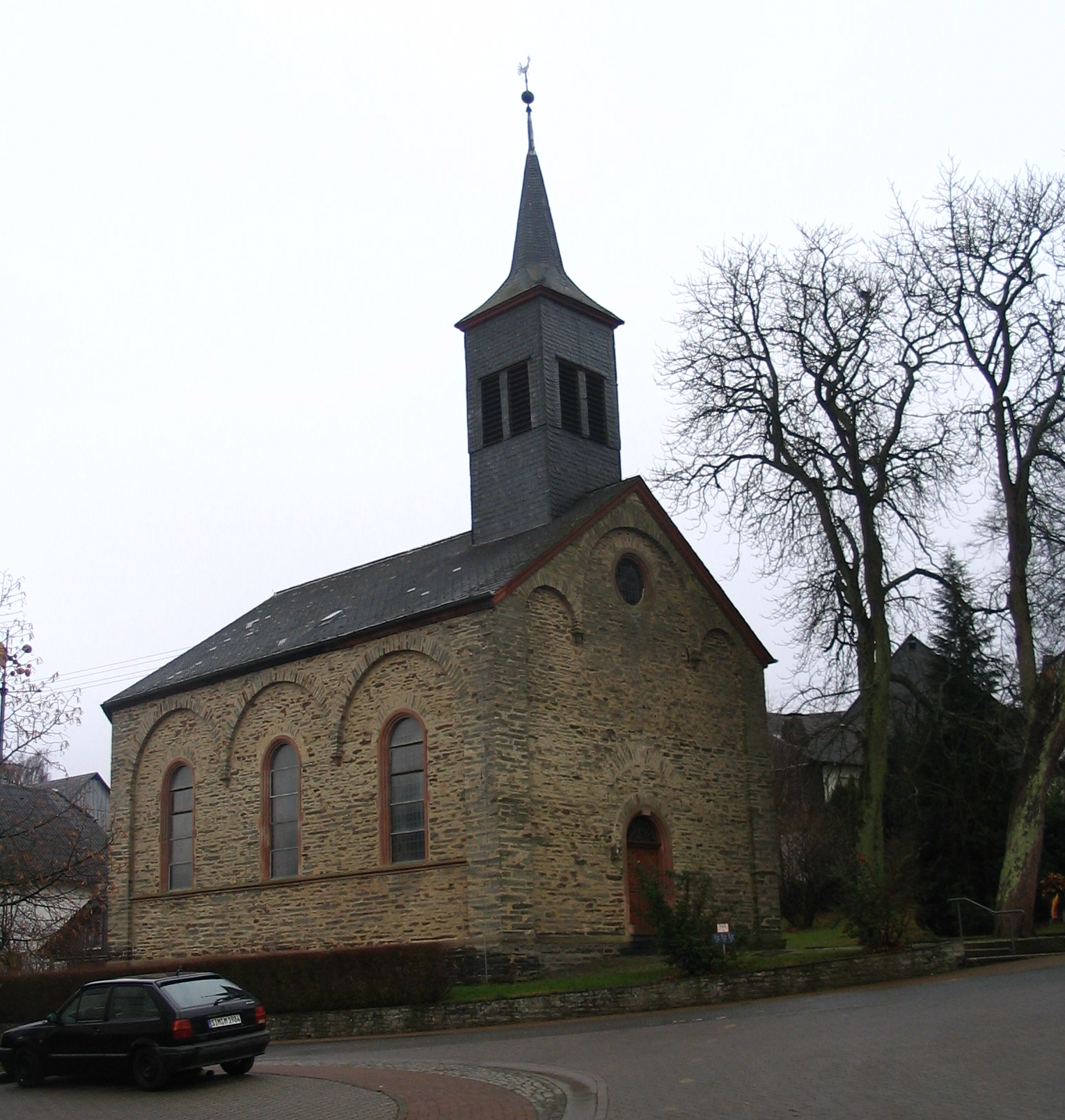
Leideneck, Hauptstraße 6: Evangelical church

=== Buildings ===
The following are listed buildings or sites in Rhineland-Palatinate’s Directory of Cultural Monuments:

==== Bell (main centre) ====
- Evangelical church, Hauptstraße 5 – Baroque aisleless church, marked 1728, Romanesque west tower; whole complex of buildings with church and graveyard
- Hauptstraße 24 – building with mansard roof, timber framing slated, about 1800
- Hauptstraße 25 – estate complex along the street; building with hipped mansard roof, timber framing sided, about 1800, barn, stable
- Hauptstraße 27 – timber-frame house, partly solid and slated, mid 19th century
- Hauptstraße 29 – timber-frame house, partly solid and slated, half-hipped roof, 18th century; whole complex of buildings together with no. 31
- Hauptstraße 31 – timber-frame house, slated, 18th or 19th century; whole complex of buildings together with no. 29
- Hauptstraße/corner of Landesstraße (State Road) 204 – boundary stone, marked 1866
- Rothenberger Hof 5 – Rothenberger Hof; estate complex along the street; timber-frame house, slated, 19th century

==== Hundheim ====
- Dorfstraße 18 – timber-frame house, half-hipped roof, 18th century

==== Krastel ====
- Dorfstraße 6 – Quereinhaus (a combination residential and commercial house divided for these two purposes down the middle, perpendicularly to the street), timber framing plastered, partly slated, 19th century
- Dorfstraße 39 – estate complex; timber-frame house, partly solid, sided, 18th or 19th century; timber-frame barn, marked 1792; second barn, marked 1849

==== Leideneck ====
- Evangelical church, Hauptstraße 6 – aisleless church, 1850–1852
- At Oberstraße 1 – Classicist door, early 19th century

==== Völkenroth ====
- Im Weiherchen 1 – timber-frame house, slated, 19th century
- Ringstraße 7 – Quereinhaus, timber framing slated, 19th century
- Ringstraße 19 – estate complex, 19th century; timber-frame house, slated, barn
- Ringstraße 21 – estate complex, 19th century; timber-frame house, slated, timber-frame barn
- Ringstraße 23 – L-shaped estate complex, 19th century; timber-frame house, partly slated, commercial wing

==== Wohnroth ====
- Dorfstraße 28 – timber-frame house, partly solid, half-hipped roof, earlier half of the 18th century

== Economy and infrastructure ==
Until the 1950s there was mining within Bell's municipal limits near the railway station at the Ilse manganese ore mine.

Among other businesses, the village has a car and truck workshop, an electrical installer's shop, a goldsmith’s shop and, on the road to the old railway station, an underground and road construction business. Besides the Bell-Vue, there is one other inn run on a pension basis.
