= Maus Castle =

Castle in Rhineland-Palatinate, Germany

- Burg Maus
- Wellmich
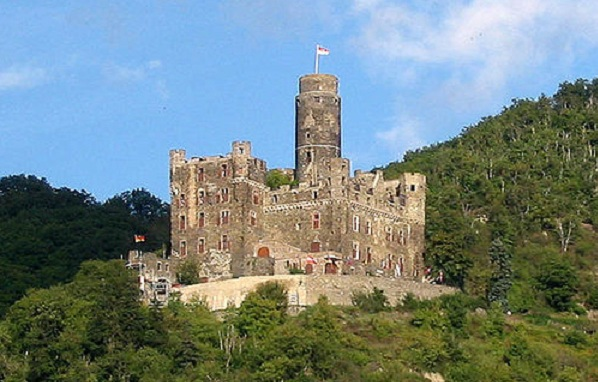
- Burg Maus as seen from the Rhine

Site information
- Type: Medieval castle

Location
- Coordinates: 50°10′18″N 7°41′46″E

Site history
- Built: 1353/1356

Maus Castle (German: Burg Maus, meaning Mouse Castle) is a castle above the village of Wellmich (part of Sankt Goarshausen) in Rhineland-Palatinate, Germany. It lies on the east side of the Rhine, north of Katz Castle (Cat Castle) in Sankt Goarshausen and opposite Rheinfels Castle at Sankt Goar across the river.

== History ==
Construction of the castle was begun in 1356 by Archbishop-Elector of Trier Bohemond II and was continued for the next 30 years by successive Electors of Trier. The construction of Burg Maus was to enforce Trier's recently acquired Rhine River toll rights and to secure Trier's borders against the Counts of Katzenelnbogen (who had built Burg Katz and Burg Rheinfels). In the latter half of the 14th century Burg Maus was one of the residences of the Elector of Trier.

Unlike its two neighbouring castles, Burg Maus was never destroyed, though it fell into disrepair in the 16th and 17th centuries. Restoration of the castle was undertaken between 1900 and 1906 under the architect Wilhelm Gärtner with attention to historical detail.

The castle suffered further damage from shelling during World War II which has since been repaired. Today Burg Maus hosts an aviary that is home to falcons, owls and eagles, and flight demonstrations are staged for visitors from late March to early October.

== Architecture ==
The ward of the castle contains two residential buildings. The vulnerable side facing uphill is guarded by a round bergfried.

== Names ==
Local folklore attributes the name to the Counts of Katzenelnbogen's mocking of the Electors of Trier during the 30 years of construction, who reportedly said that the castle was the "mouse" that would be eaten by the "cat" of Burg Katz. The originally intended name was Burg Peterseck (or St. Peterseck). A matched castle on the left bank (to control the bank north of Burg Rheinfels) that was to be named Burg Peterberg was never constructed. Other names by which Burg Maus is known are Thurnberg (or Thurmberg) and Deuernburg.

== Gallery ==
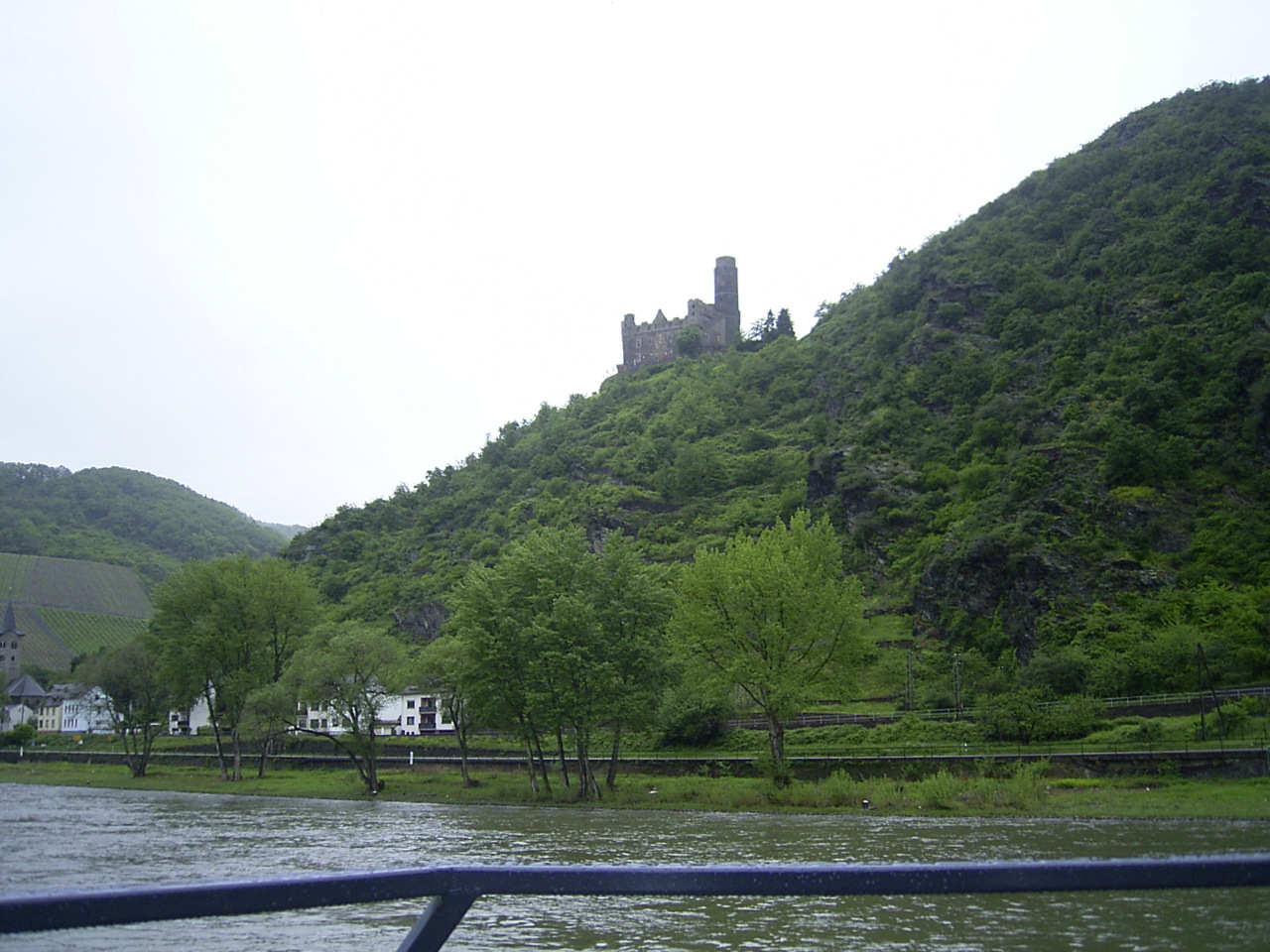
Burg Maus above the Rhine.

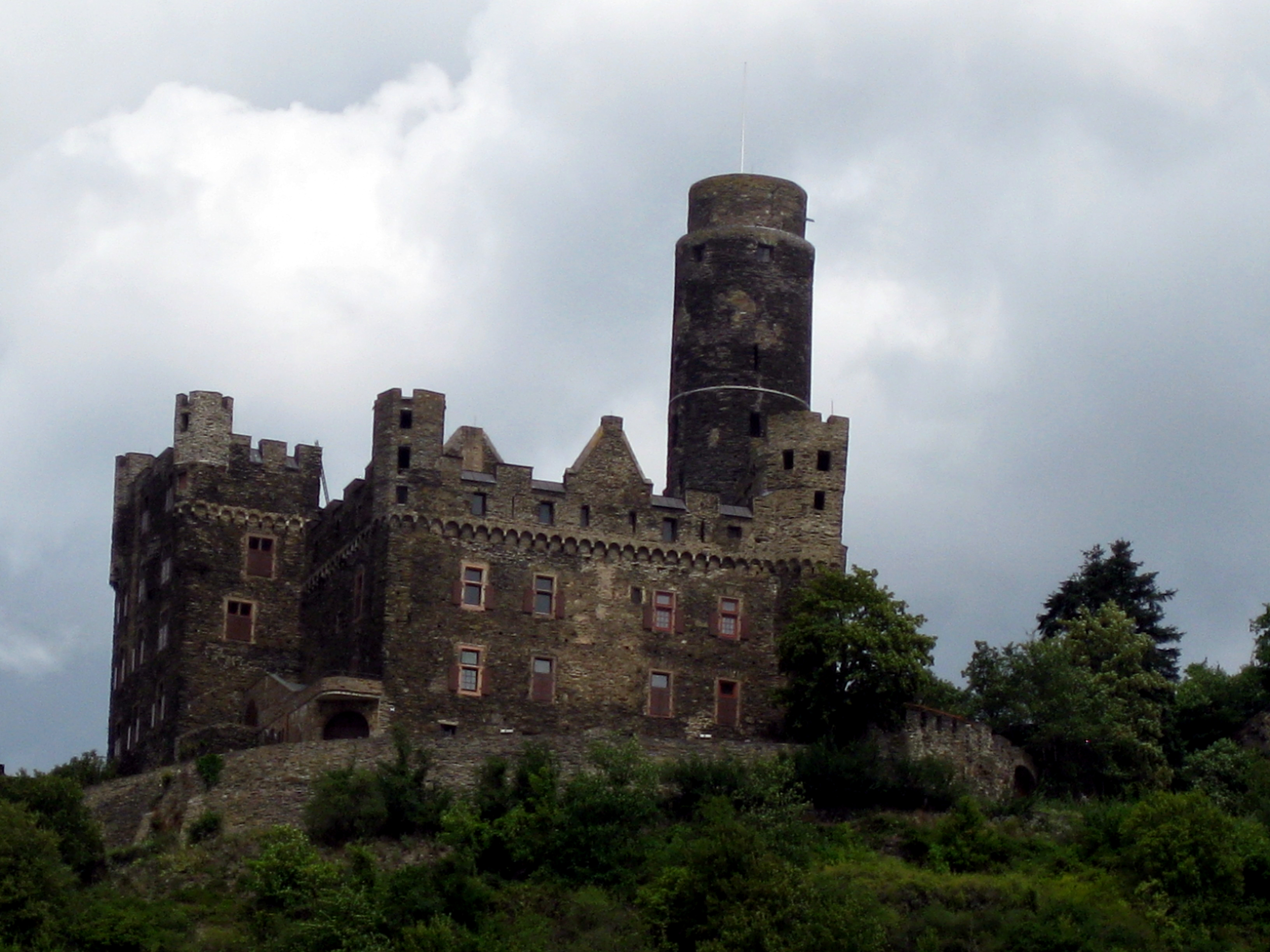
Burg Maus, as seen from the Rhine.

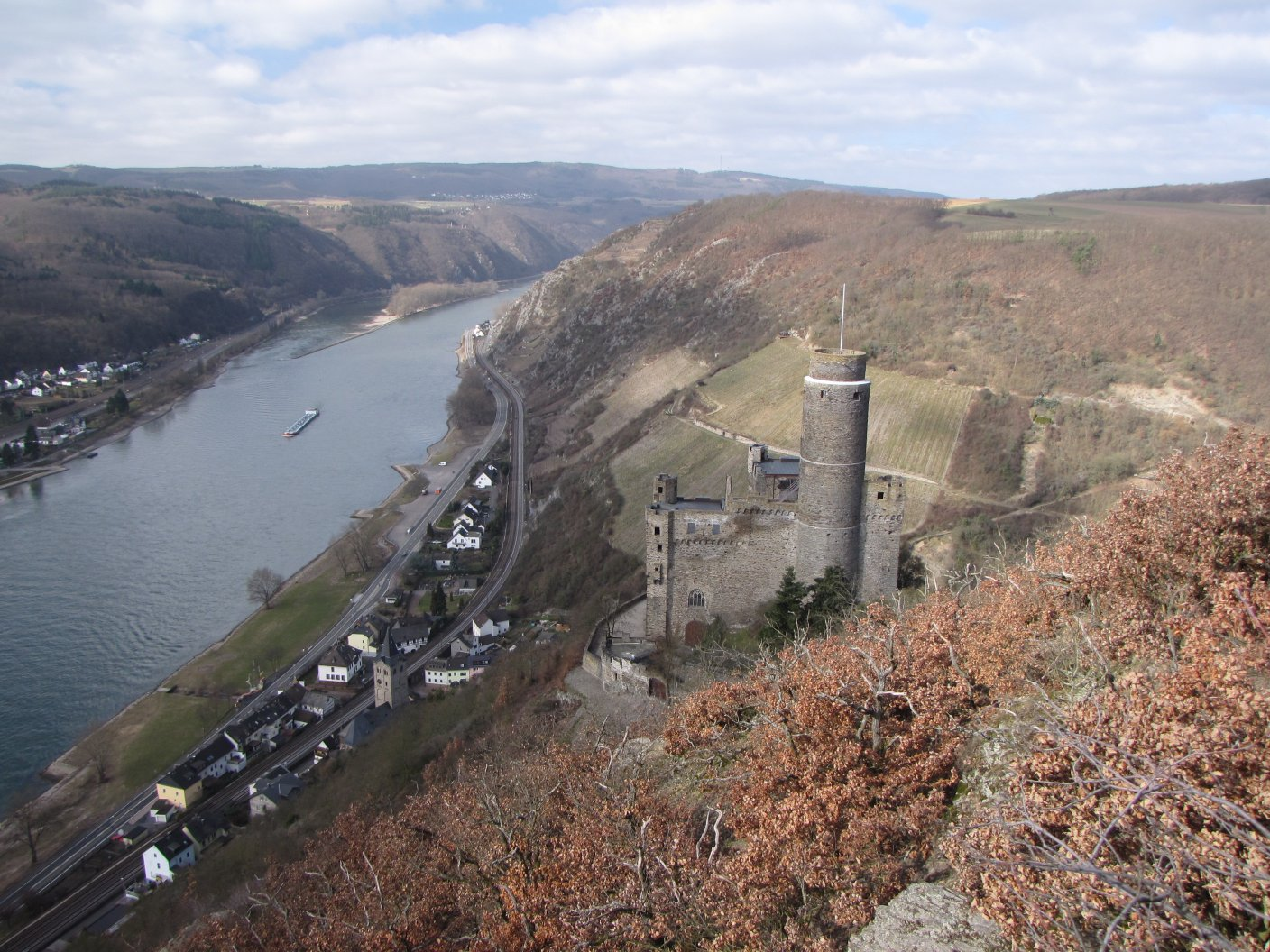
Burg Maus from above the village of Wellmich
