= Katz Castle =

Castle in Rhineland-Palatinate, Germany

Coordinates: 50°09′06″N 7°43′27″E

Katz Castle

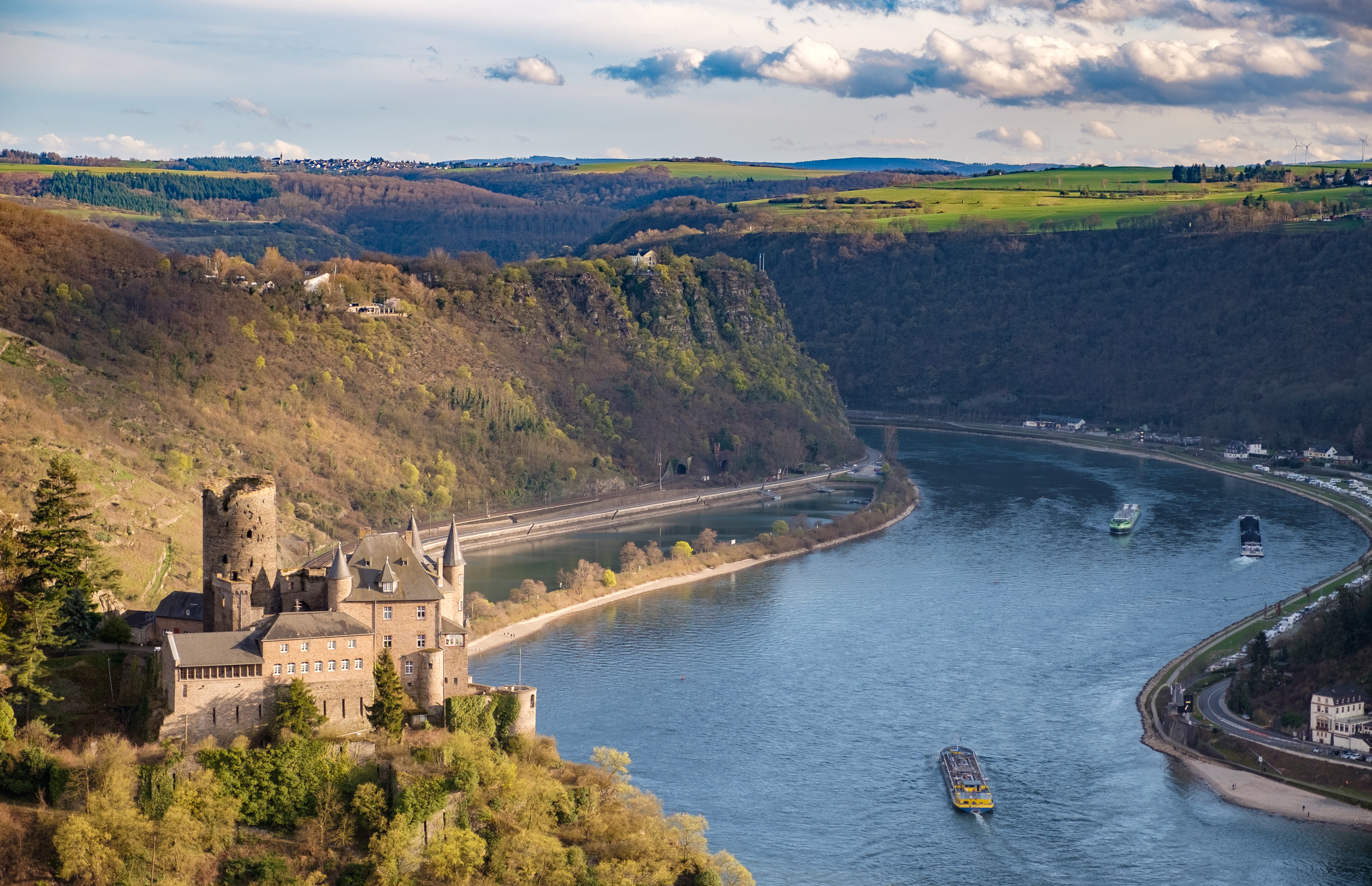
St. Goarshausen, Katz Castle and the Lorelei rocks

Katz Castle (German: Burg Katz) is a castle above the German town of Sankt Goarshausen in Rhineland-Palatinate. The castle stands on a ledge looking downstream from the riverside at Sankt Goar. It was first built around 1371 by Count William II of Katzenelnbogen. The castle was bombarded in 1806 by Napoleon and rebuilt in the late 19th century, in 1896–98. It is now privately owned, and not open for visitors.

== Description ==
=== Etymology ===
After the original castle "Burg Katzenelnbogen" (lit. Castle [of] Cat's Elbow) this medieval fortress castle is officially known as Burg Neukatzenelnbogen (Castle [of] New Cat's Elbow). It used to be and still is, however, comfortably and commonly contracted to "die [Burg] Katz" ("the [Castle] Cat").

As such, it is popularly linked with Burg Maus ("the [Castle] Mouse"), which was indeed erected as close as possible to its military counterpart.

=== Architecture ===
The castle is of compact layout, consisting mainly of a great hall and a massive bergfried, originally 40 metres tall, on the uphill side.

In 1435, the Counts of Katzenelnbogen were the first to plant Riesling grapes in their vineyard.

Katz Castle and its surroundings are the place of action for the Belgian comic book L'Orgue du Diable in the Yoko Tsuno series by Roger Leloup.

=== Gallery ===
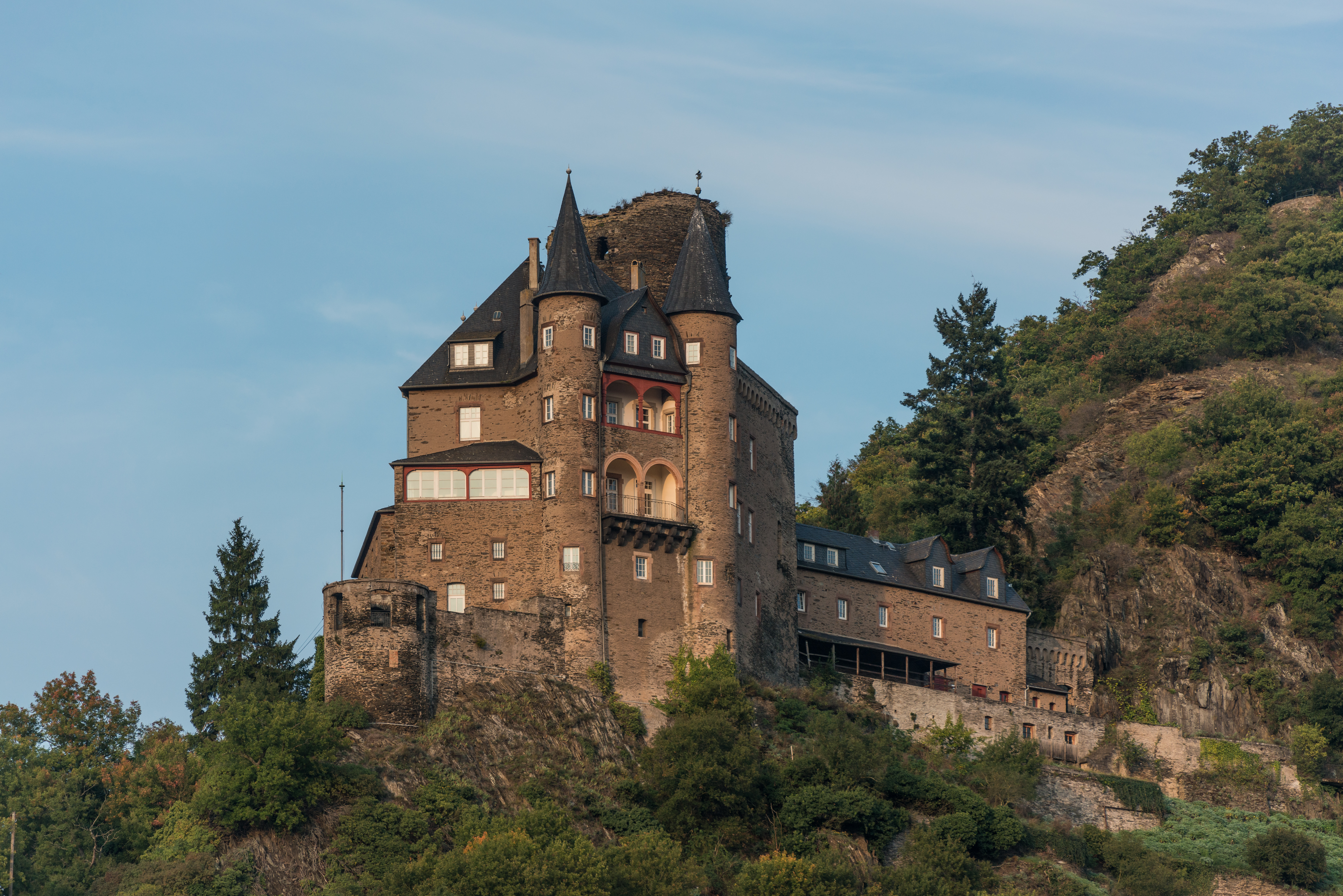
Southwest view

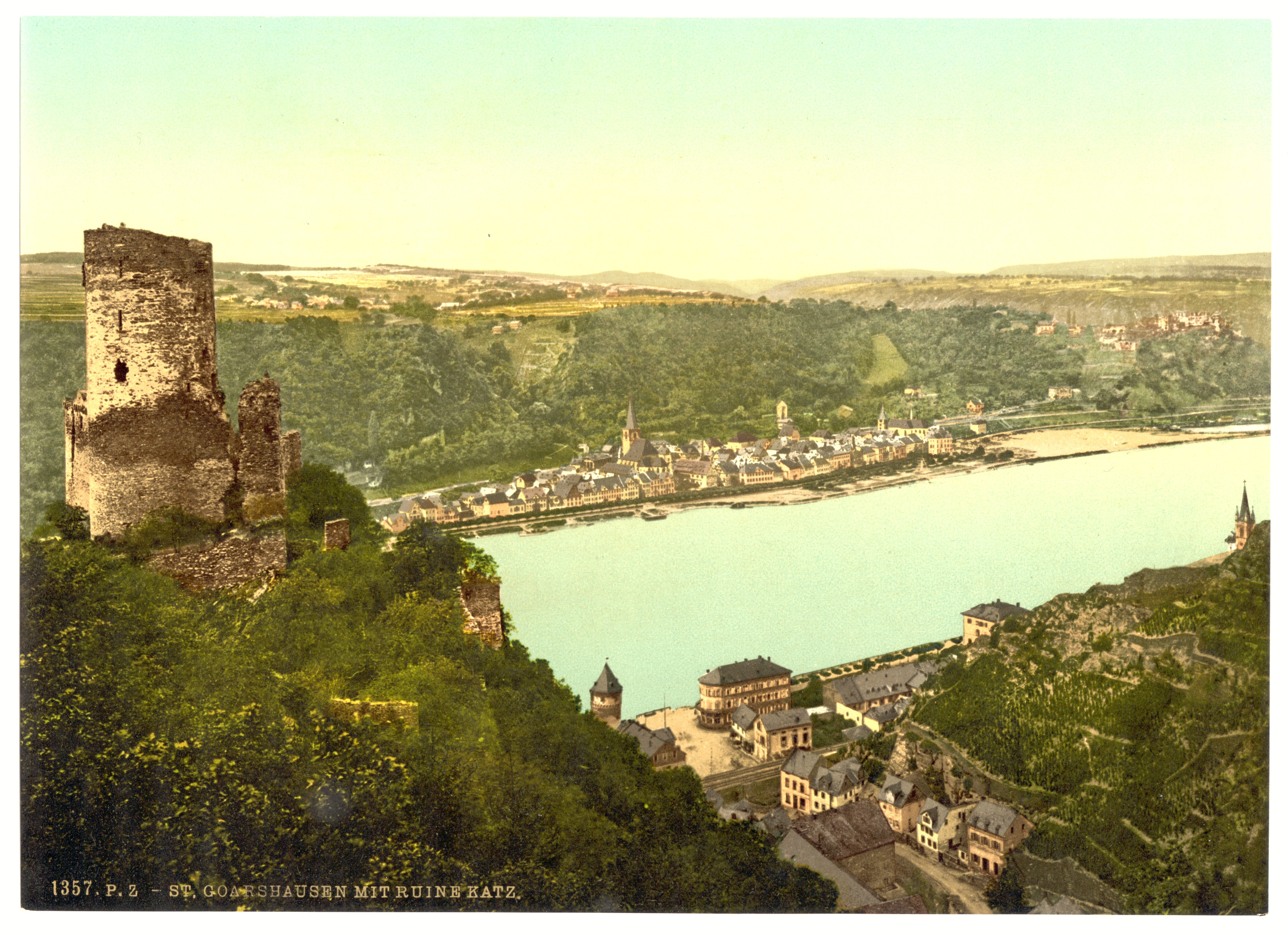
The castle in the 1890s, before the reconstruction

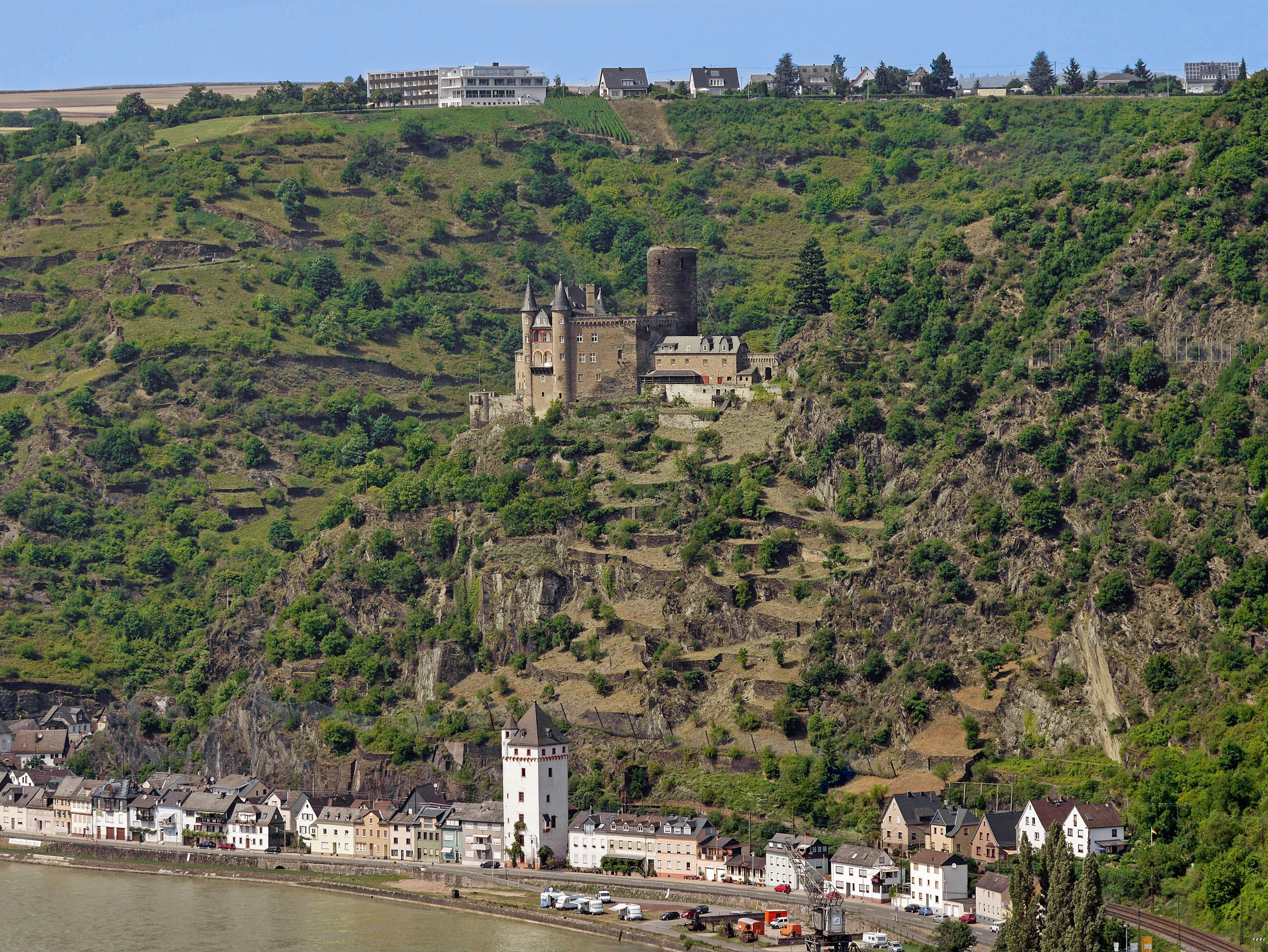
View from Lorelei rocks

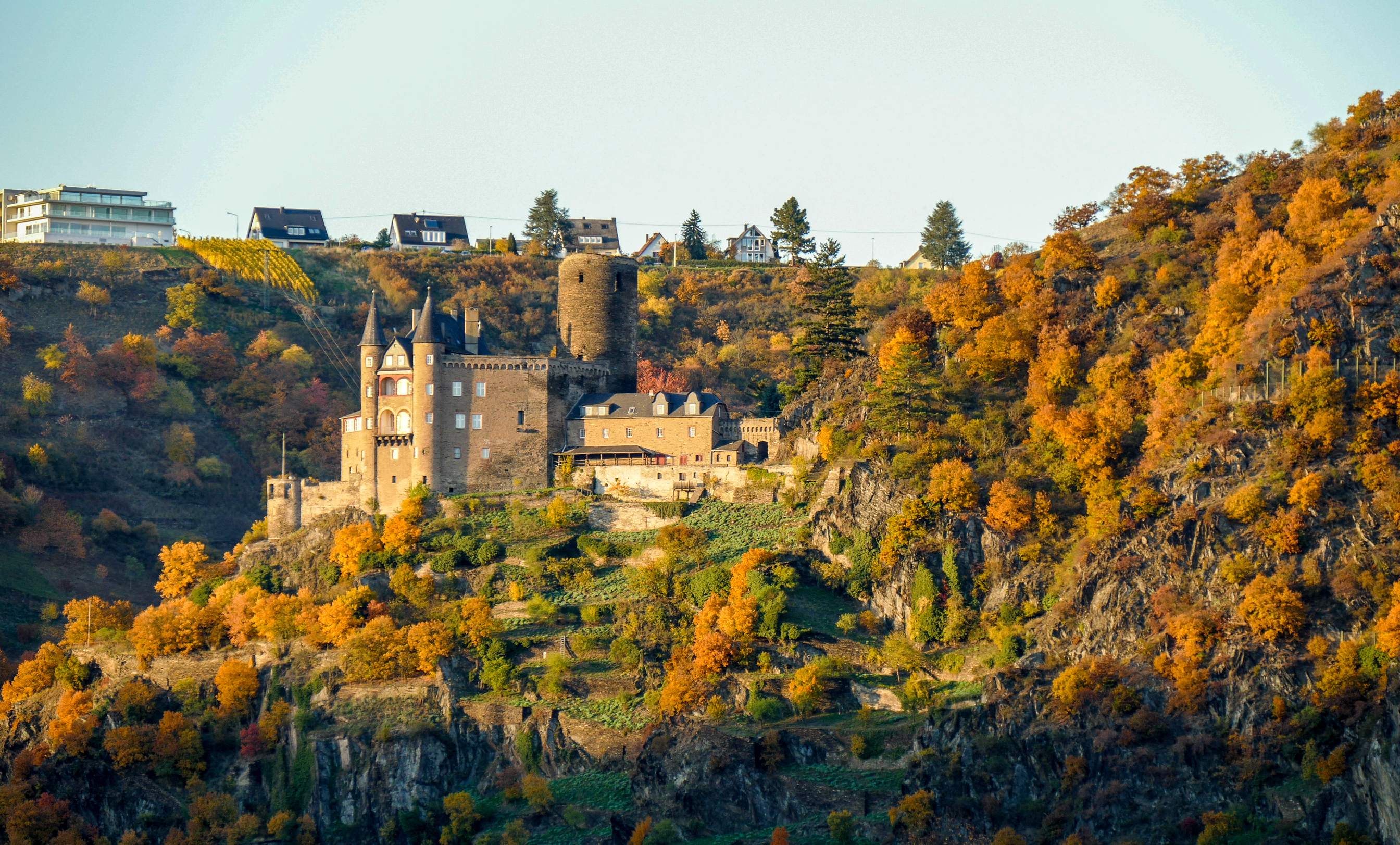
View from Lorelei harbor

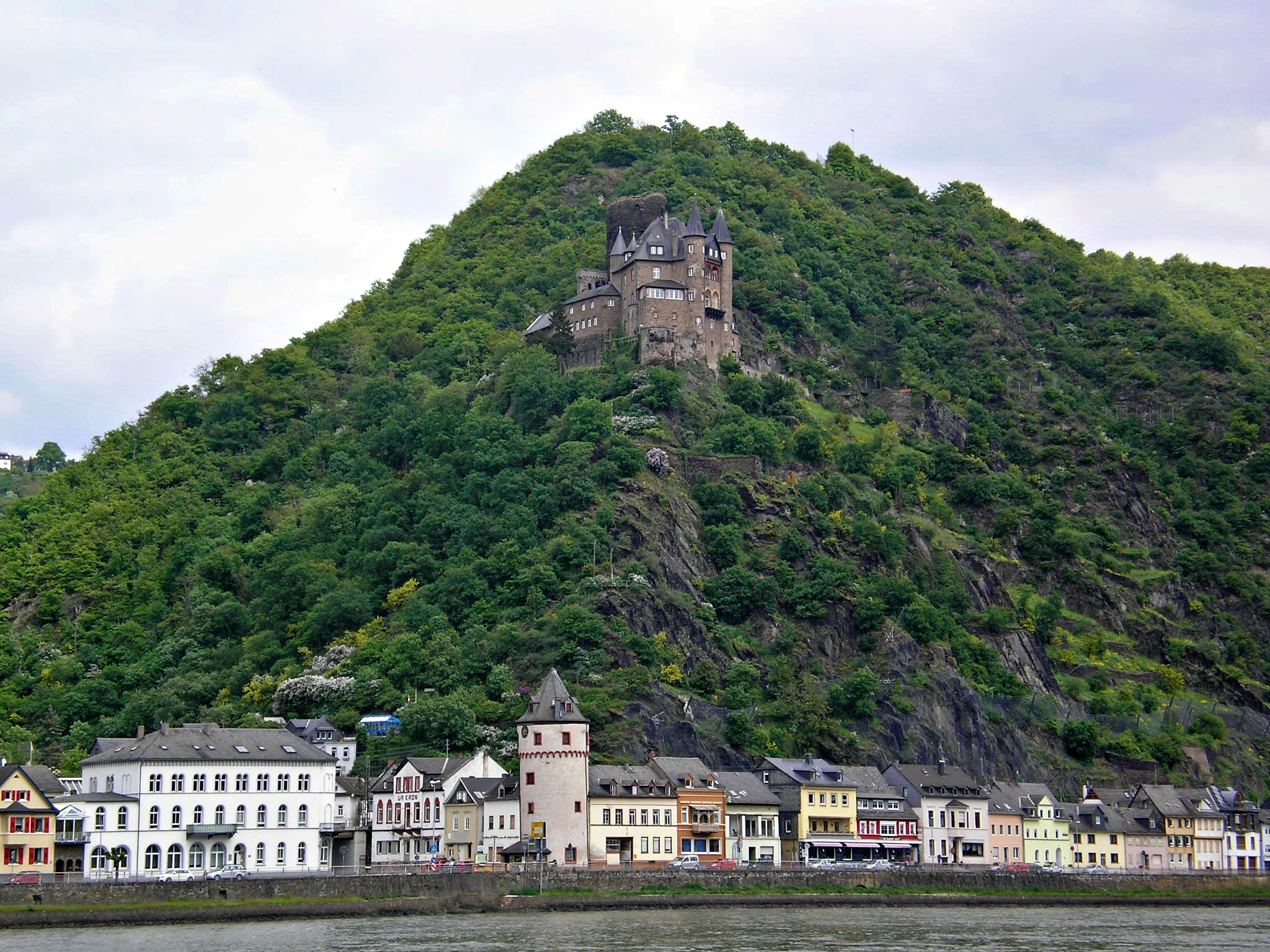
View from Rhine
