= Sankt Goarshausen =

Town in Rhineland-Palatinate, Germany

- Town
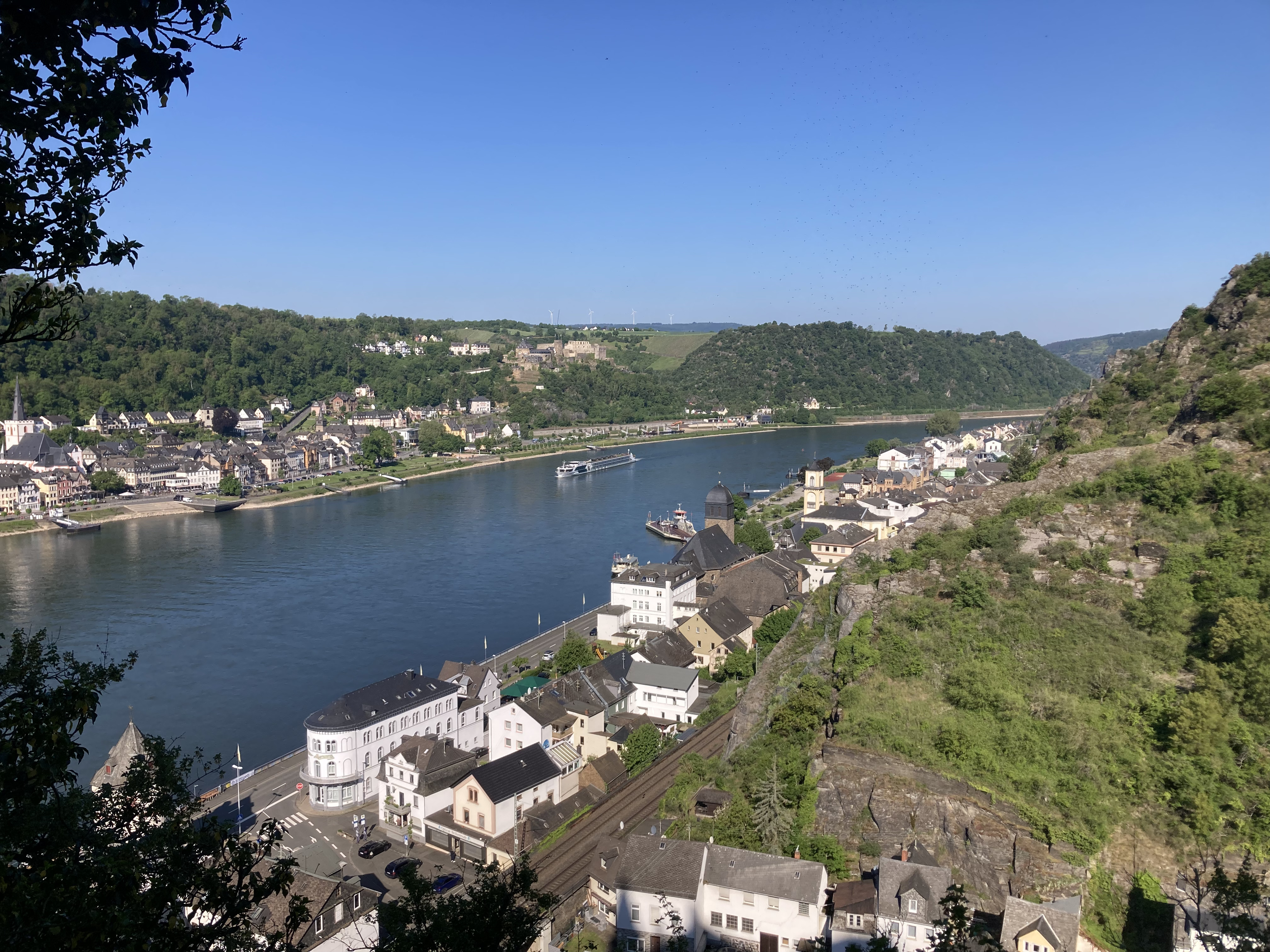

- Coat of arms

- Location of Sankt Goarshausen within Rhein-Lahn-Kreis district
- Interactive map of Sankt Goarshausen
- Location within Germany Location within Rhineland-Palatinate
- Coordinates: 50°9′17″N 7°42′55″E
- Country: Germany
- State: Rhineland-Palatinate
- District: Rhein-Lahn-Kreis
- Municipal assoc.: Loreley
- Subdivisions: 4

Government
  - Mayor (2019–24): Matthias Pflugradt

Area
  - Total: 7.06 km^{2} (2.73 sq mi)
- Elevation: 100 m (330 ft)

Population (2025-12-31)
  - Total: 1,242
  - Density: 176/km^{2} (456/sq mi)
- Time zone: UTC+01:00 (CET)
  - Summer (DST): UTC+02:00 (CEST)
- Postal codes: 56346
- Dialling codes: 06771
- Vehicle registration: EMS, DIZ, GOH
- Website: www.sankt-goarshausen.de

Sankt Goarshausen (German pronunciation: [zaŋkt ɡoaːɐ̯sˈhaʊzn̩]; abbreviated St. Goarshausen) is a town located in the Rhein-Lahn-Kreis in Nassau on the eastern shore of the Rhine, in the section known as the Rhine Gorge, directly across the river from Sankt Goar, in the German state Rhineland-Palatinate. It is located within the Nassau Nature Park and the Rhine Gorge UNESCO world heritage site, and was historically part of the Duchy of Nassau. It lies approximately 30 km south of Koblenz, and it is above all famous for the Lorelei rock nearby. Sankt Goarshausen is the seat of the Loreley collective municipality. The town's economy is based on wine making and tourism.

The Sankt Goarshausen railway station connects the town with Wiesbaden, Frankfurt and Koblenz. Sankt Goarshausen was formerly the terminus of the Nassau Light Railway line between Sankt Goarshausen and Nastätten.

== History ==
In 1885, St. Goarshausen had almost 1,456 inhabitants. Close to the town in the hillside just above it, lie the ruins of 14th century Castle Katz, ruined since 1806.

== Demographics ==
Traditionally more than 60% of the population are Protestants, while around 30% are Catholics; however Sankt Goarshausen is located in close proximity to Catholic-majority areas where the reverse situation exists. Due to the abandonment of religious beliefs, fewer people are members of the churches today, whether Protestant or Catholic. Sankt Goarshausen had a small but well-established Jewish community from the 17th century to the 1930s, peaking at 2.4% in 1895. As of 1860, the district of St. Goarshausen, which included St. Goarshausen proper and its surrounding villages, had a population that included 8557 Protestants, 3840 Catholics, 110 Jews and 6 Mennonites.

== Economy ==
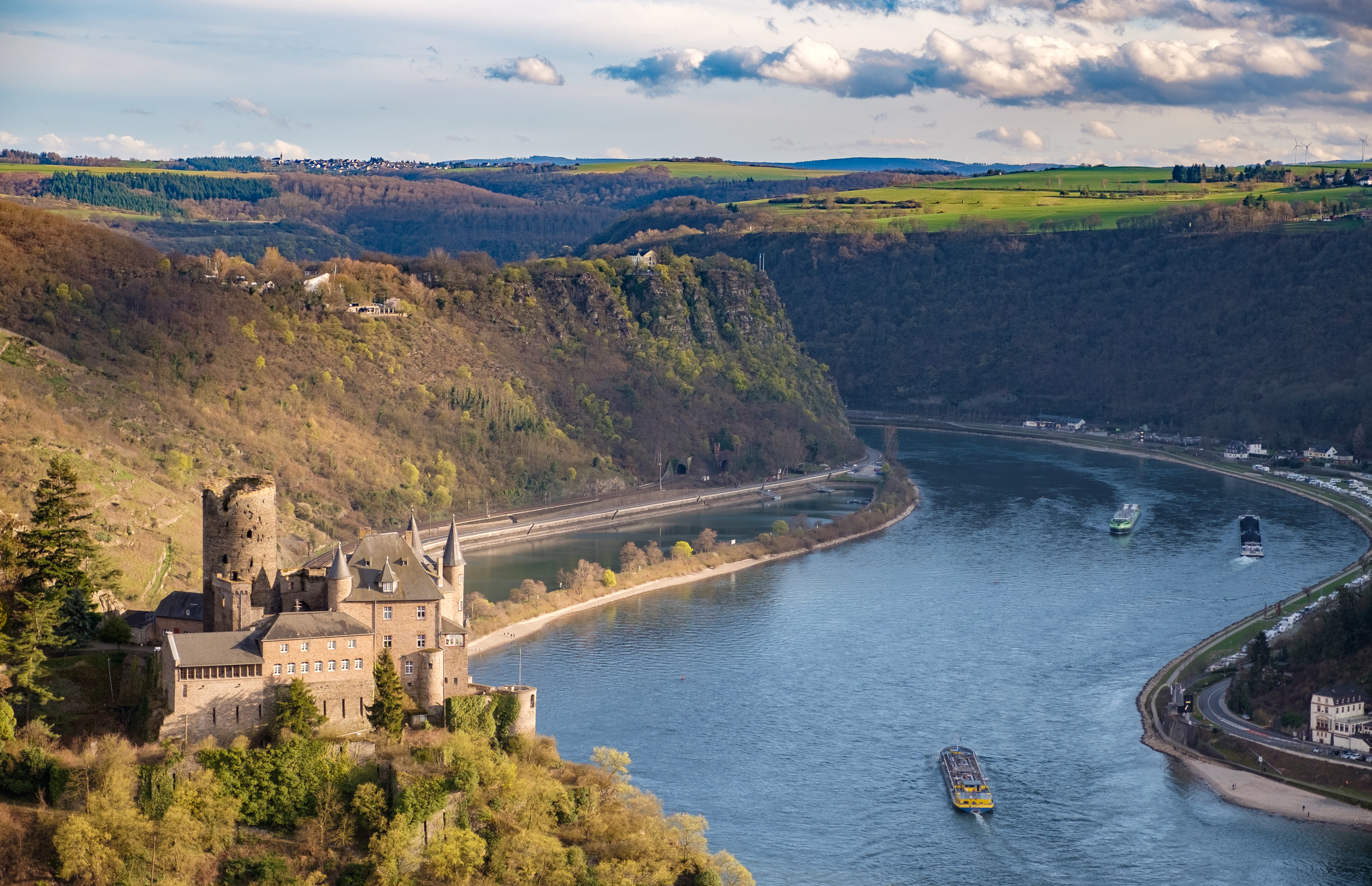
St. Goarshausen, Castle Katz with Lorelei rock in the Rhineland-Palatinate

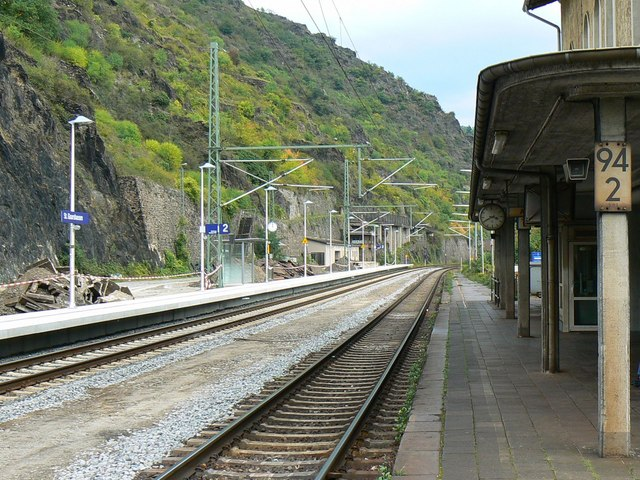
Sankt Goarshausen train station

Loreley ferry runs between Sankt Goar and Sankt Goarshausen

Former railway station of Nassauische Kleinbahn to Zollhaus near Hahnstätten

The town has 1,585 inhabitants as of December 31, 2002, and is the seat of the township association (Verbandsgemeinde) Loreley. With the villages Ehrental, Wellmich and Heide, the number of inhabitants is over 2,000.

The most important economic areas for St. Goarshausen are tourism and wine making. In earlier times the town was an important place along the Rhein for fishing and as an embarkation area. Today, the formerly very busy town is losing its importance and relies more and more on tourism. Especially problematic for St. Goarshausen is the short distance to the larger city Nastätten, that has replaced St. Goarshausen as the regional centre.

In tourism, the biggest competitor is the twin city St. Goar on the other shore of the Rhine. St. Goar is only reachable by ferry, as the closest bridge is 30 km away. While there is an established need for a bridge across the Rhine, plans for connecting the towns have not yet been realised.

To help tourism, a visitors centre has been established in connection to the Lorelei rock.

== Sights ==
The most famous and most popular tourist attraction in town is the Lorelei rock.

In St. Goarshausen, there are two castles, Burg Katz (English: Castle Cat, formerly Burg Neu-Katzenelnbogen) and Burg Maus (English: Castle Mouse). Burg Katz is not open for visitors. There is a good view of the town from Burg Maus, and also visible are the ruins of Burg Rheinfels on the other side of Rhine.

== Recurring events ==
- The third weekend of September: Rhein in Flammen, large fireworks from Burg Katz in St. Goarshausen, Burg Rheinfels in St. Goar and from the middle of the Rhine.
- The Night of the Prog festival was held annually at the Loreley Amphitheatre (except in 2020 when it was cancelled due to the pandemic) until 2024, the year of the Final Night of the Prog.

== Gallery ==
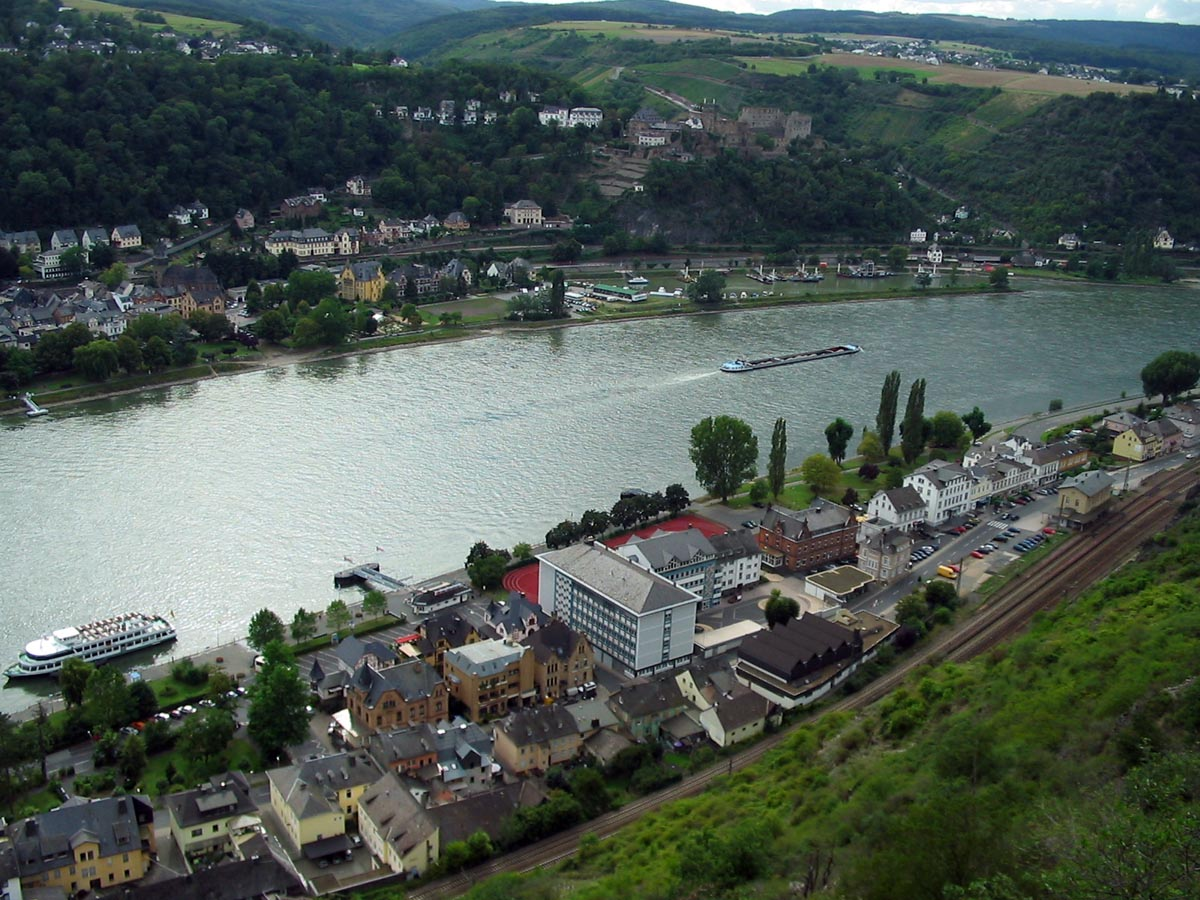
View of St. Goarshausen

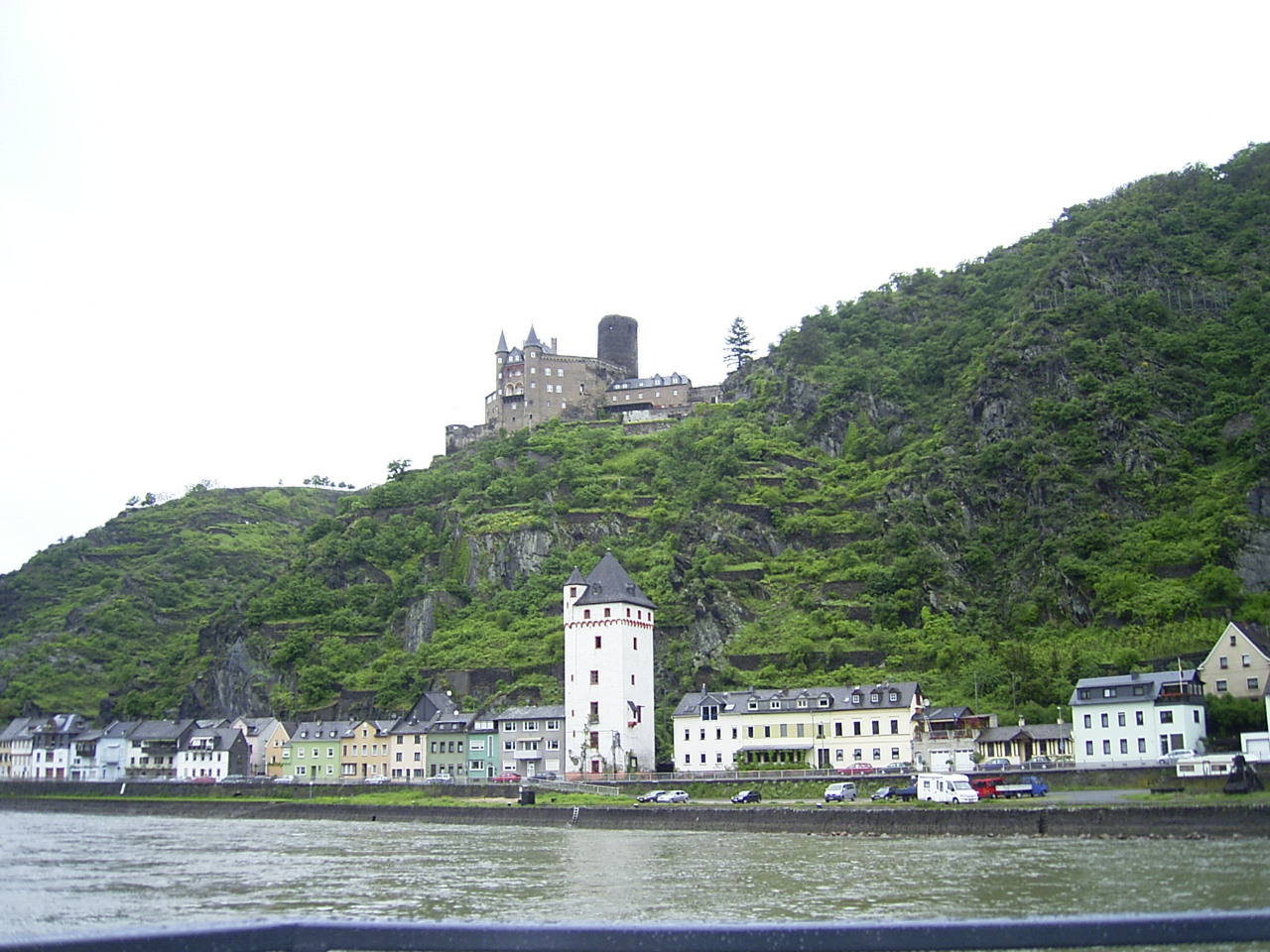
Burg Katz, above St. Goarshausen

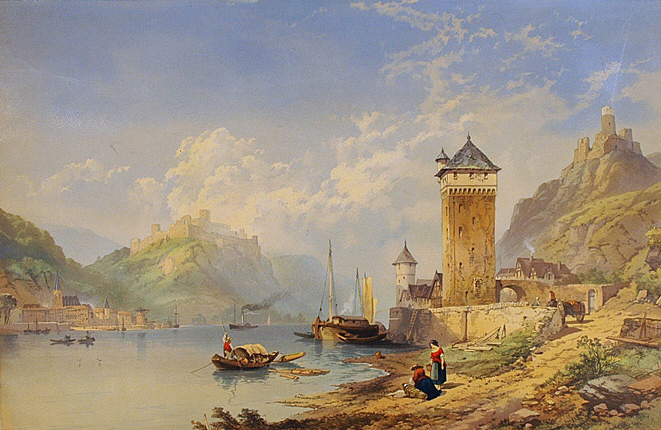
St. Goarshausen, by Thomas M. Richardson

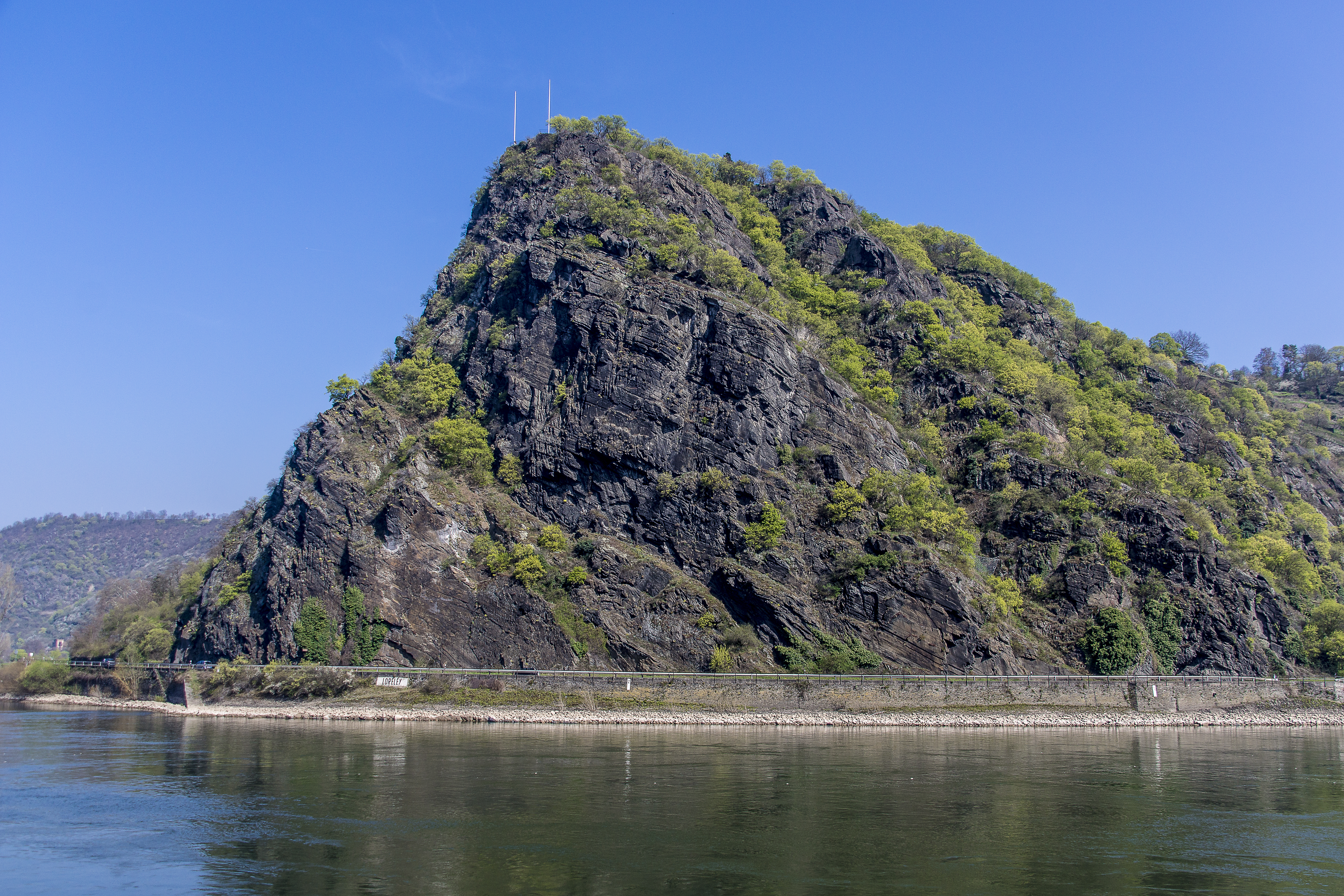
Loreley Rock

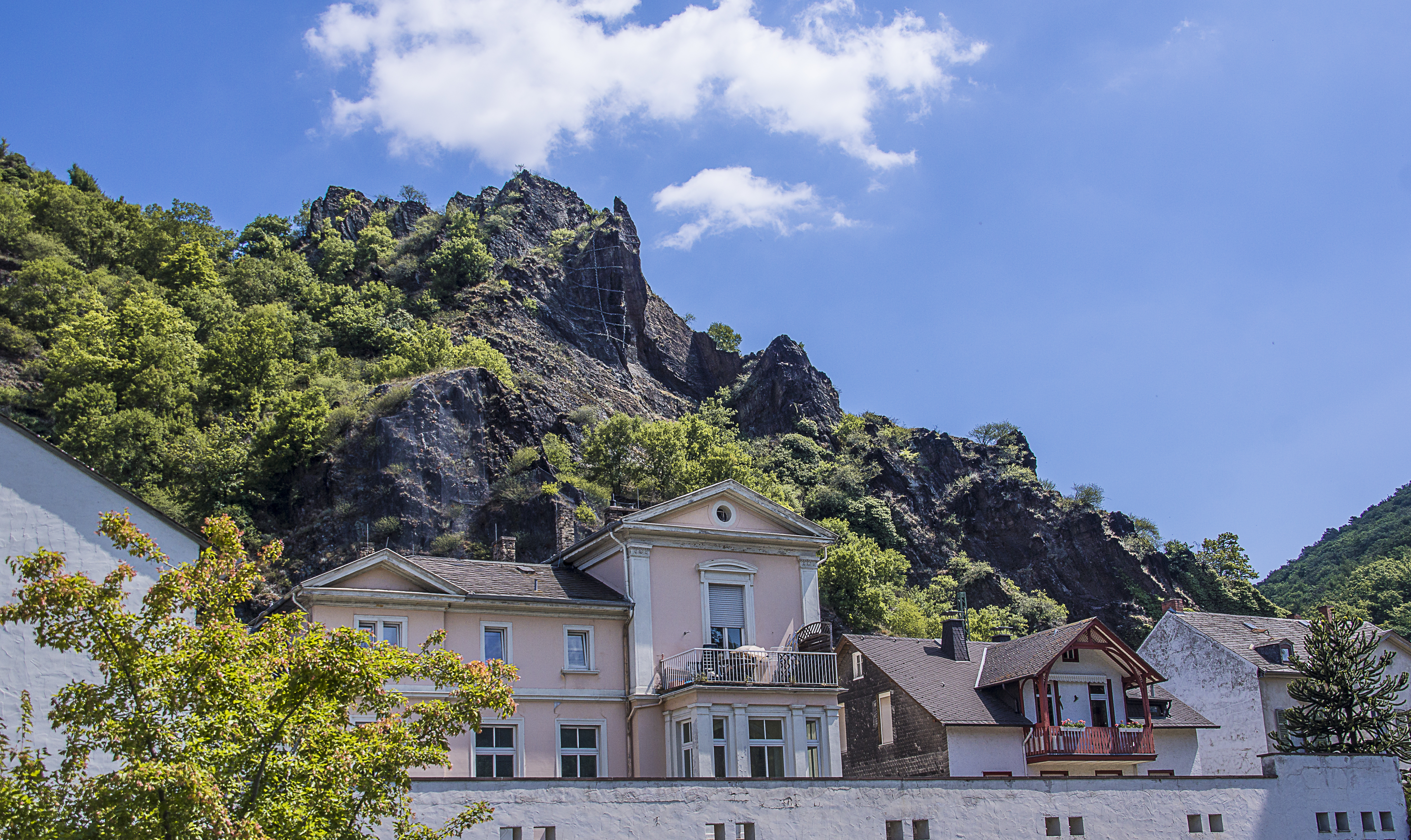
St. Goarshausen

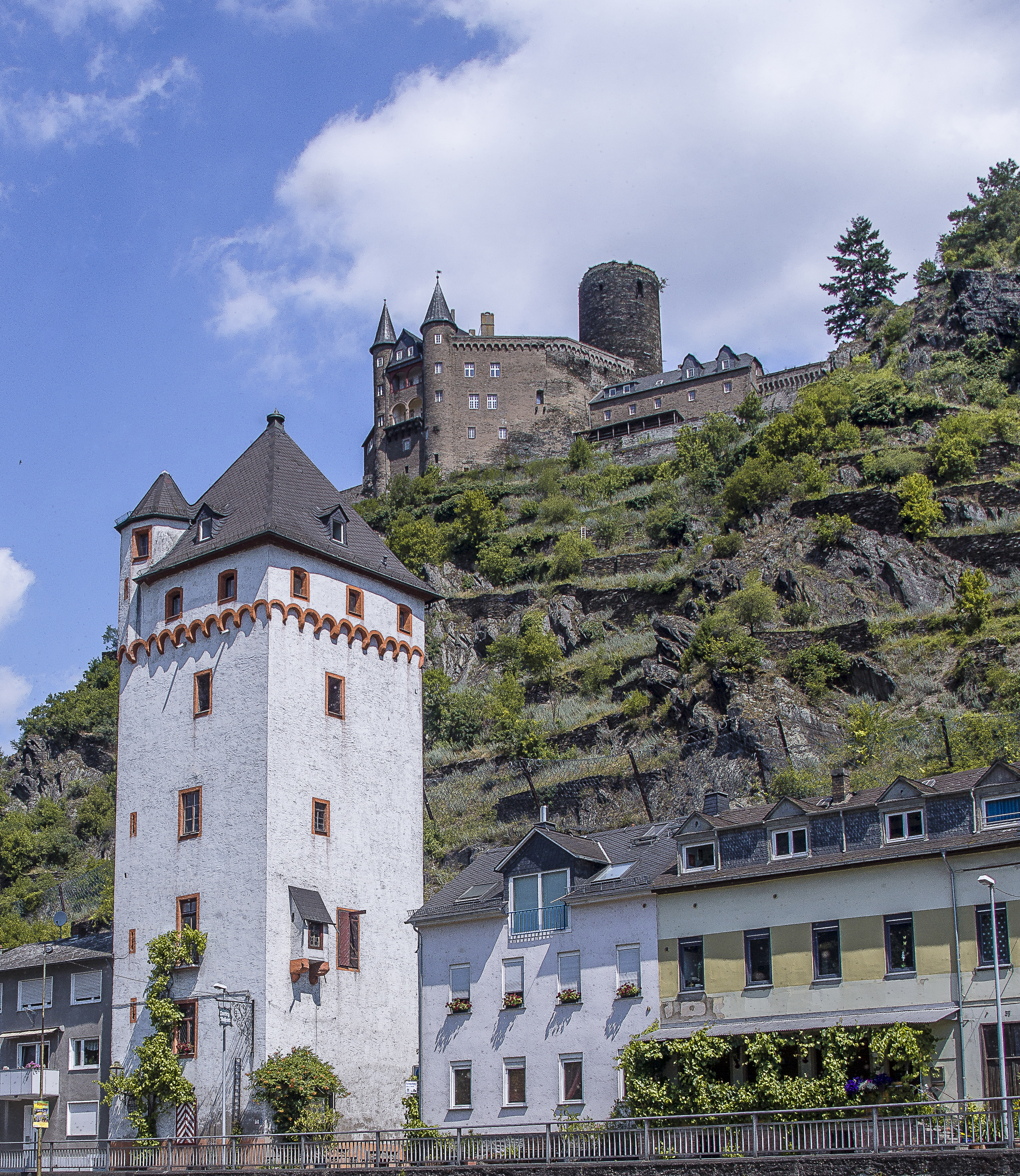
St. Goarshausen

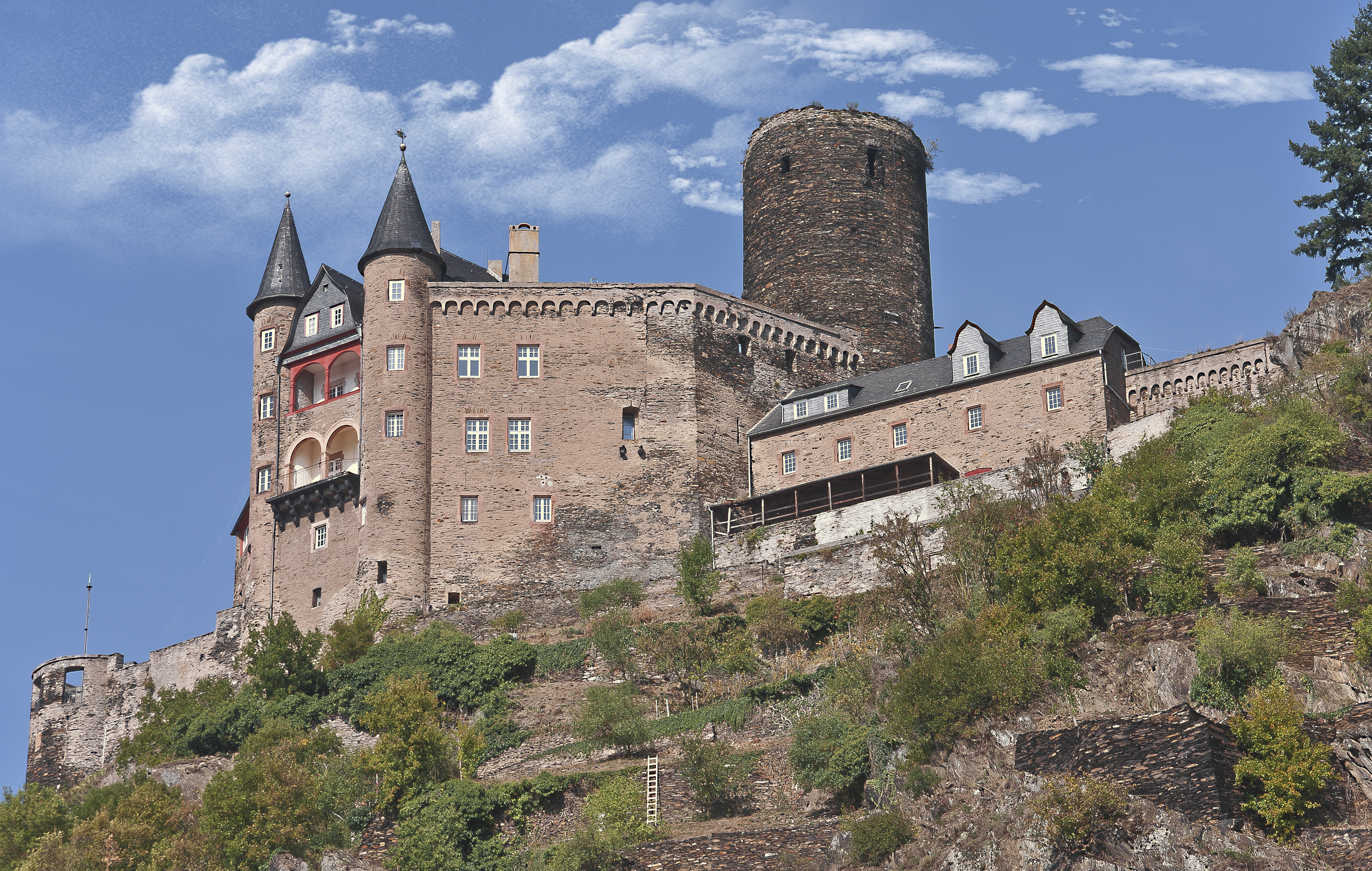
Castle Katz

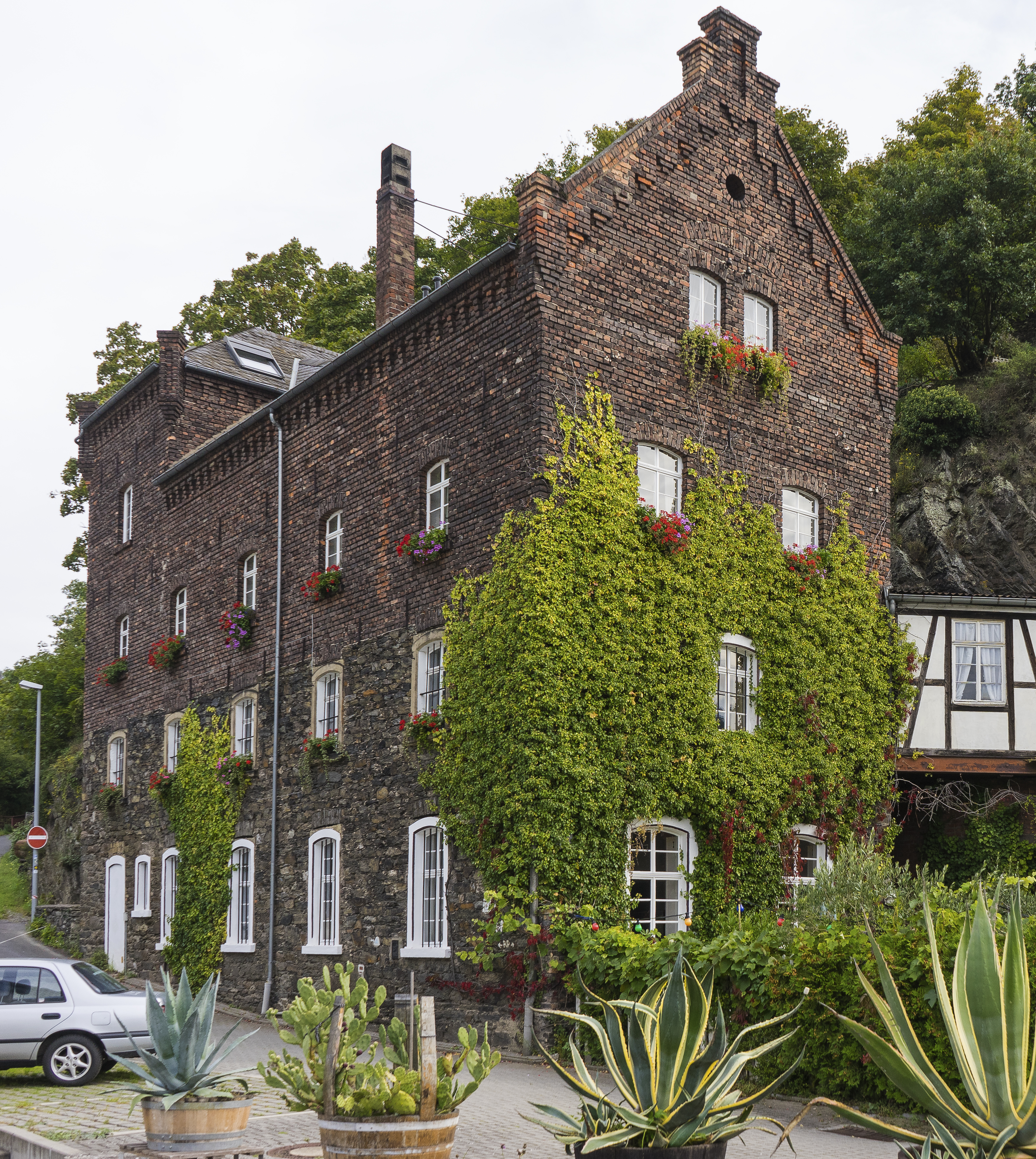
Secthaus St. Goarshausen

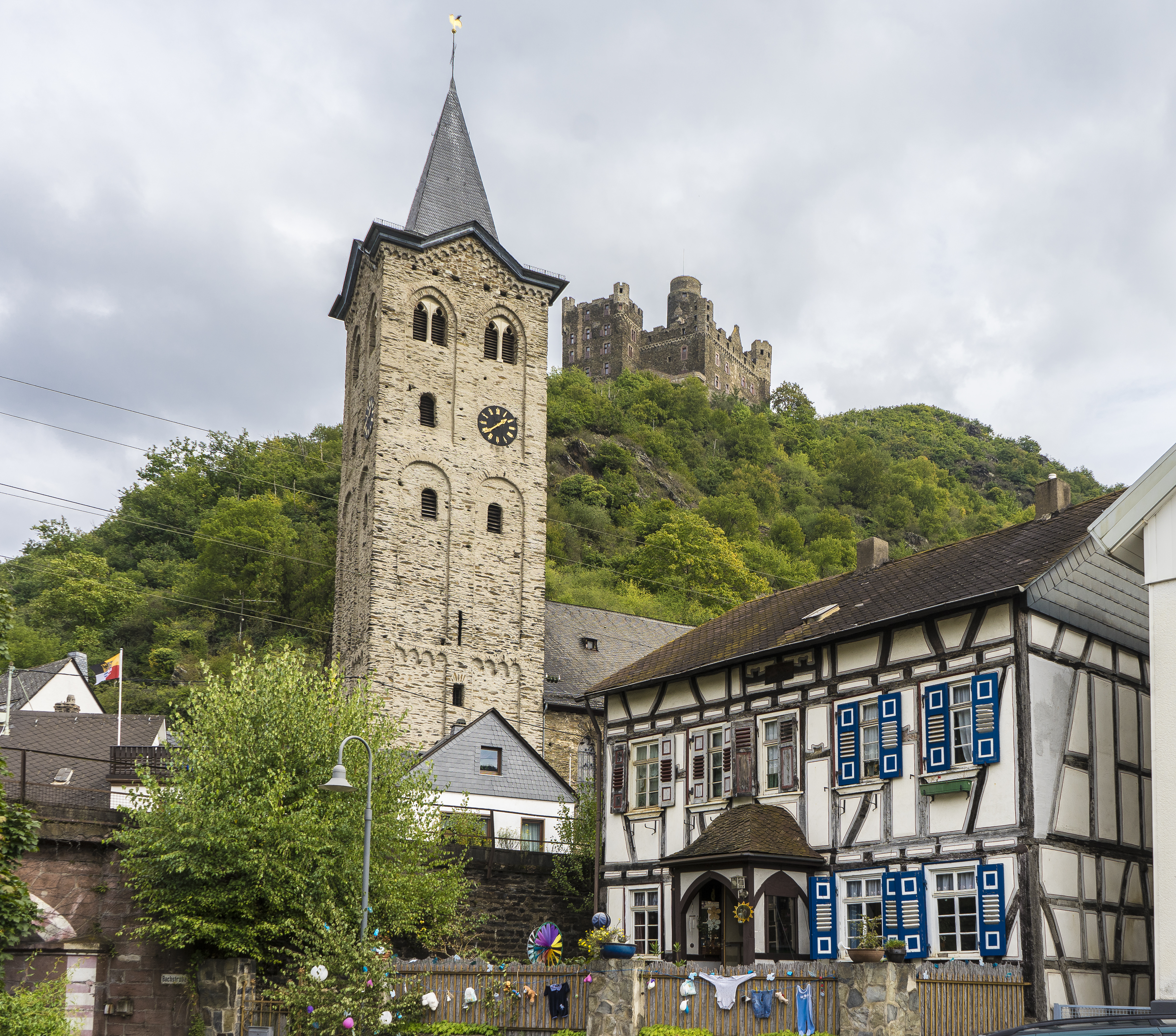
St. Goarshausen - Wellmich

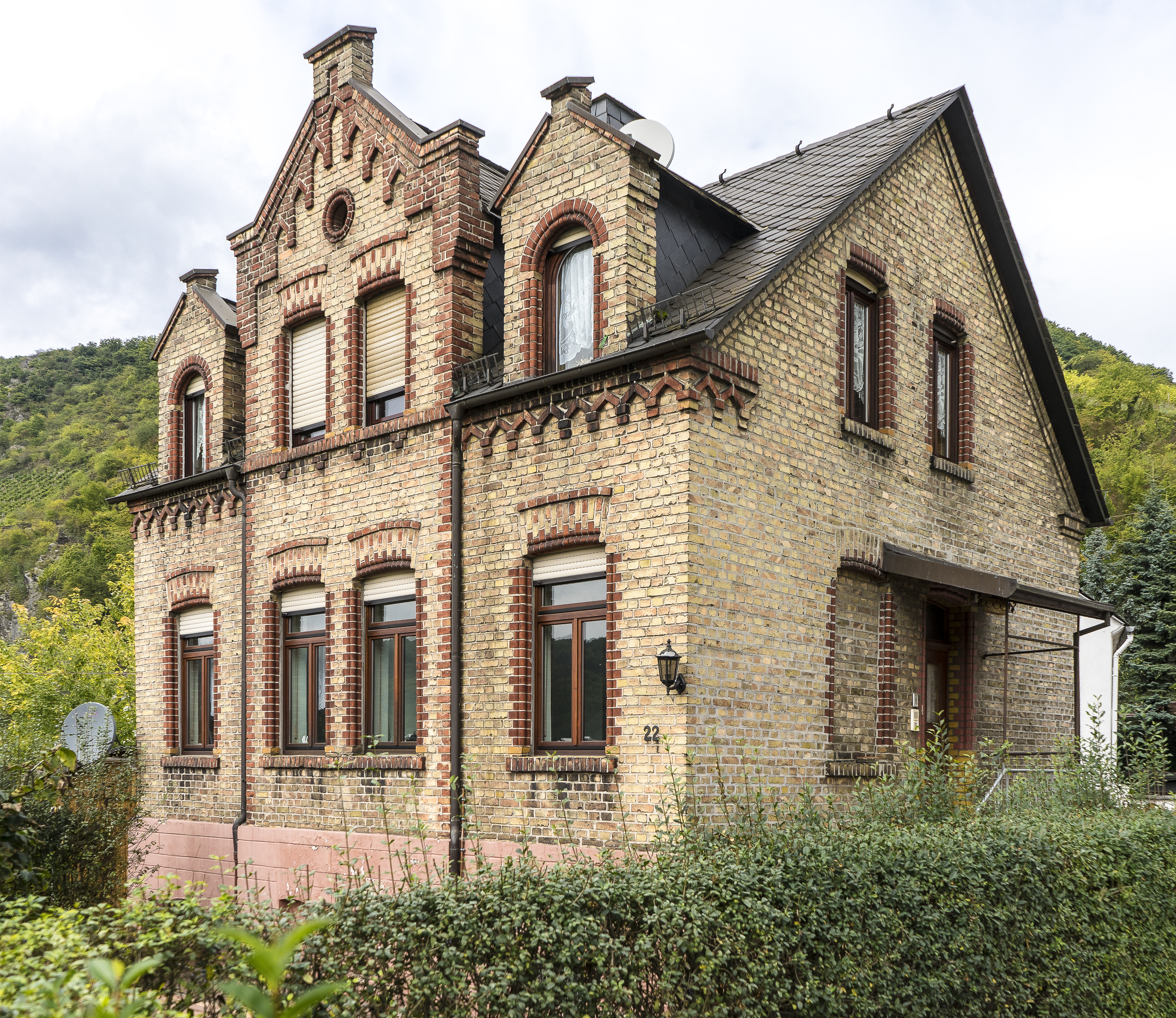
St. Goarshausen - Wellmich

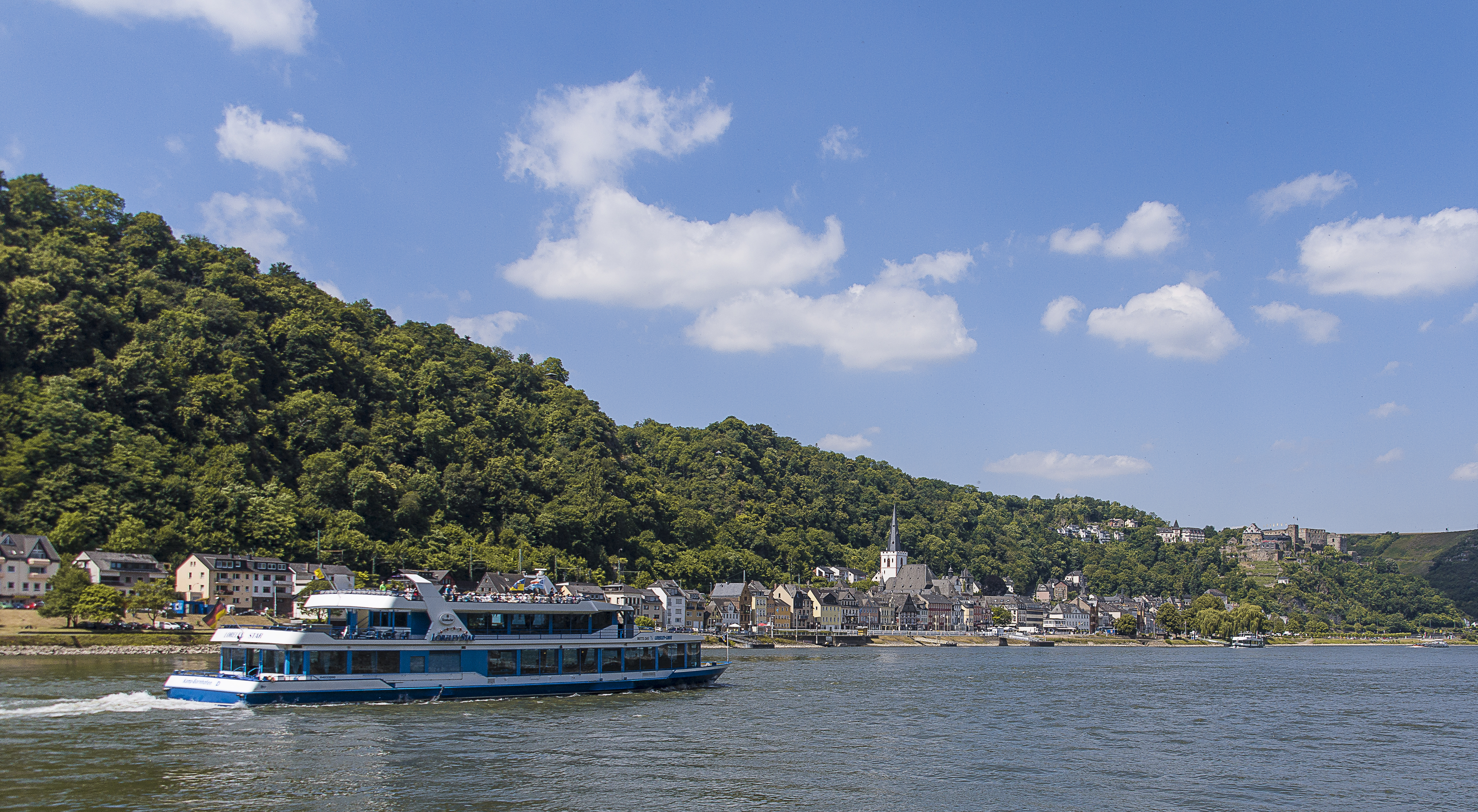
St. Goar

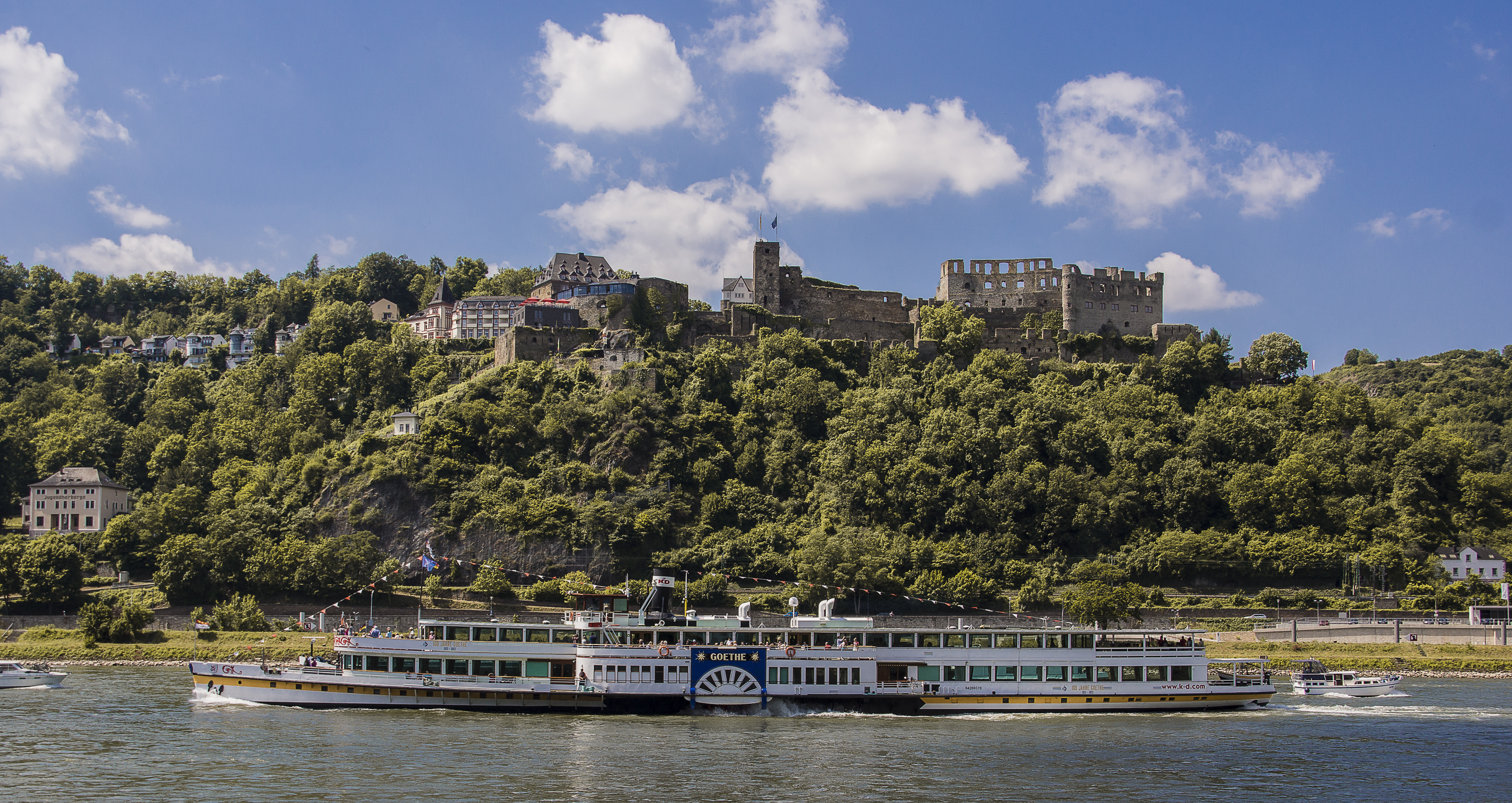
Castle Rheinfels

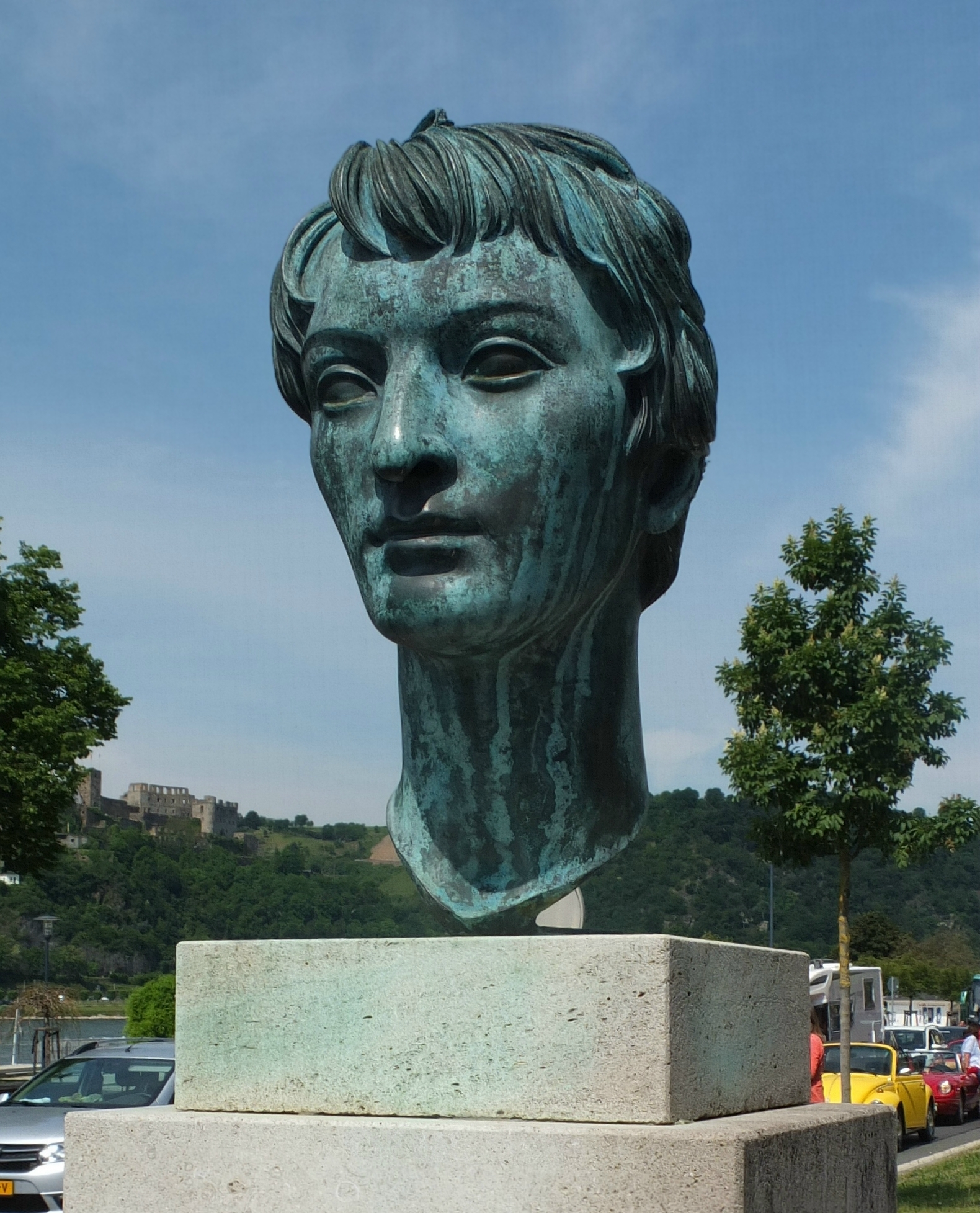
Bust of Heinrich Heine
