= Gore (surname) =

Gore is a surname. Notable people with the surname include:

== People with the surname ==
=== A-E ===
- Al Gore (born 1948), American politician, US Vice President, author, and environmental activist;
- Albert Gore Sr. (1907–1998), American lawyer and politician; father of Al Gore;
- Alan Gore (1926–2006), Australian-born British architectural designer and garden historian;
- Altovise Gore (a.k.a. Altovise Davis; 1943–2009), American dancer and actress; wife of Sammy Davis Jr.;
- Arthur Gore (disambiguation), multiple individuals;
- Bill Gore (1912–1986), American chemist, chemical engineer, and businessman;
- Bobby Gore (1936–2013), American street gang leader and activist;
- Catherine Gore (1798–1861), British novelist and dramatist;
- Charles Gore (disambiguation), multiple individuals;
- Chester Gore (1893–1966), American film art director;
- Christopher Gore (disambiguation), multiple individuals;
- Constance Gore-Booth (a.k.a. Constance Markievicz; 1868–1927), Irish nationalist, socialist revolutionary, politician, and suffragist;
- Craig Gore (businessman) (born 1967), Australian entrepreneur;
- Damien Gore (born 1999), Irish Gaelic footballer;
- David Alan Gore (1957–2012), American serial killer;
- David Gore (disambiguation), multiple individuals;
- Delilah Gore (born 1962), Papua New Guinean politician;
- Derrick Gore (born 1994), American football player;
- Dev Gore (born 1997), American race car driver;

=== F-L ===
- Francis Gore (disambiguation), multiple individuals;
- Frank Gore (born 1983), American football player;
- Frank Gore Jr. (born 2002), American football player;
- Frederic Gore (chemist) (1860–1930), American chemist;
- Frederick Gore (1913–2009), British painter;
- George Gore (disambiguation), multiple individuals;
- Gordon Gore (1913–1987), American football player;
- Gore baronets, three baronetcies of Ireland;
- Graham Gore (fl.1845–1847), British lieutenant and polar explorer;
- Harold Gore (1891–1969), American college sports coach;
- Howard Mason Gore (1877–1947), American politician;
- Ian Gore (born 1968), English footballer;
- Jack Gore (rugby) (1899–1971), Welsh international rugby player;
- Jack Gore (actor) (born 2005), American actor;
- James Howard Gore (1856–1939), American mathematician, author, and educator;
- Jason Gore (born 1974), American golfer;
- Jeff Gore (born ?), American physicist;
- John Gore (disambiguation), multiple individuals;
- Julie Gore (born 1958), Welsh darts player;
- Karenna Gore (born 1973), American lawyer and author; daughter of Al and Tipper Gore;
- Kristin Gore (born 1977), American author and screenwriter; daughter of Al and Tipper Gore;
- Laura Gore (1918–1957), Italian actor and voice actor;
- Les Gore (1914–1991), British footballer;
- Lesley Gore (1946–2015), American singer, songwriter, actress, and activist;
- Lester O. Gore (1890–1965), American attorney and judge;
- Lovie Gore (1904–1980), American politician;

=== M-R ===
- MacKenzie Gore (born 1999), American baseball player;
- Madhav Sadashiv Gore (1921–2010), Indian social scientist, writer, and academic administrator;
- Mahlon Gore (1837–1916), American politician and newspaper editor;
- Margot Gore (1913–1993), British airwoman and osteopath;
- Marshall Lee Gore (1963–2013), American murderer and rapist;
- Martin L. Gore (born 1961), British songwriter, musician, singer, record producer, remixer, and DJ;
- Michael Gore (disambiguation), multiple individuals;
- Mrinal Gore (1928–2012), Indian socialist leader and politician;
- Nikki Gore (born 2000), Australian rules footballer;
- Paul Gore (disambiguation), multiple individuals;
- Pauline LaFon Gore (1912–2004), American lawyer and politician; mother of Al Gore;
- Ralph Gore (disambiguation), multiple individuals;
- Reg Gore (1913–1996), British footballer;
- Robert Gore (disambiguation), multiple individuals;
- Rohit Gore (born 1977), Indian information technology specialist and author;
- Ross Gore (1869–1925), New Zealand sportsman;
- Ryan Gore (born ?), American musical engineer, sound mixer, and producer;

=== S-Z ===
- Sandy Gore (born 1950), Australian actor;
- Shane Gore (born 1981), British footballer;
- Shaun Gore (born 1968), British footballer and coach;
- Shawn Gore (born 1987), Canadian football player;
- Simon Gore (born 1988), Welsh musician;
- Spencer Gore (artist) (1878–1914), British painter;
- Spencer Gore (sportsman) (1850–1906), British tennis player and cricketer; first Wimbledon tennis championship winner;
- Stacy Gore (born 1963), American football player;
- St George Richard Gore (1812–1871), Irish noble-born Australian grazier and politician;
- Suresh Gore (1965–2020), Indian politician;
- Sylvia Gore (1944–2016), British footballer and coach;
- Terrance Gore (1991–2026), American baseball player;
- Thomas Gore (1870–1949), American anti-war and disabilities activist, and politician;
- Tipper Gore (born 1948), American social issues advocate author, and photographer; wife of Al Gore;
- Tommy Gore (born 1953), British footballer;
- Walter Gore (1910–1979), British ballet dancer, company director, and choreographer;
- William Gore (disambiguation), multiple individuals.

== See also ==
- Gore (given name)
- Richard Corben (pen-name: Gore; 1940–2020), American illustrator and comic book artist

=== Similar surnames ===
- Gohr (surname)
- Gore-Browne (surname)
- Gorer (surname)
- Goring (surname)
- Göring (surname)
