= Jack Gore =

Jack Gore may refer to:

- Jack Gore (rugby) (1899–1971), Welsh rugby flanker
- Jack Gore (actor), American actor

== See also ==
- John Gore (disambiguation)
