= Cyrioctea lotzi =

Scientific classification
- Kingdom: Animalia
- Phylum: Arthropoda
- Subphylum: Chelicerata
- Class: Arachnida
- Order: Araneae
- Infraorder: Araneomorphae
- Family: Zodariidae
- Genus: Cyrioctea
- Species: C. lotzi

Binomial name
- Cyrioctea lotzi Jocqué, 2013

Species of spider

Cyrioctea lotzi is a species of spider in the family Zodariidae. It is endemic to South Africa.

== Etymology ==
The species in named after South African arachnologist Leon N. Lotz.

== Distribution ==
Cyrioctea lotzi is known from two localities: Deelfontein in the Free State and Benfontein Nature Reserve in the Northern Cape.

== Habitat ==
The species occurs at altitudes ranging from 1172 to 1298 m above sea level in the Grassland biome.

== Description ==
Male Cyrioctea lotzi have a brownish-yellow carapace with a black fovea and dark margin. The palp, chelicerae, mouthparts, sternum, and legs are yellow, with the femora suffused with dark grey. The opisthosoma is pale grey with a faint darker dorsal median stripe, while the venter and spinnerets are pale.

== Conservation ==
The species is listed as Data Deficient because the female is unknown and it appears to be rare with very limited sampling. It is protected in Benfontein Nature Reserve, but more sampling is needed to collect females and determine the species' true range.
