= John Hall-Edwards =

British medical doctor

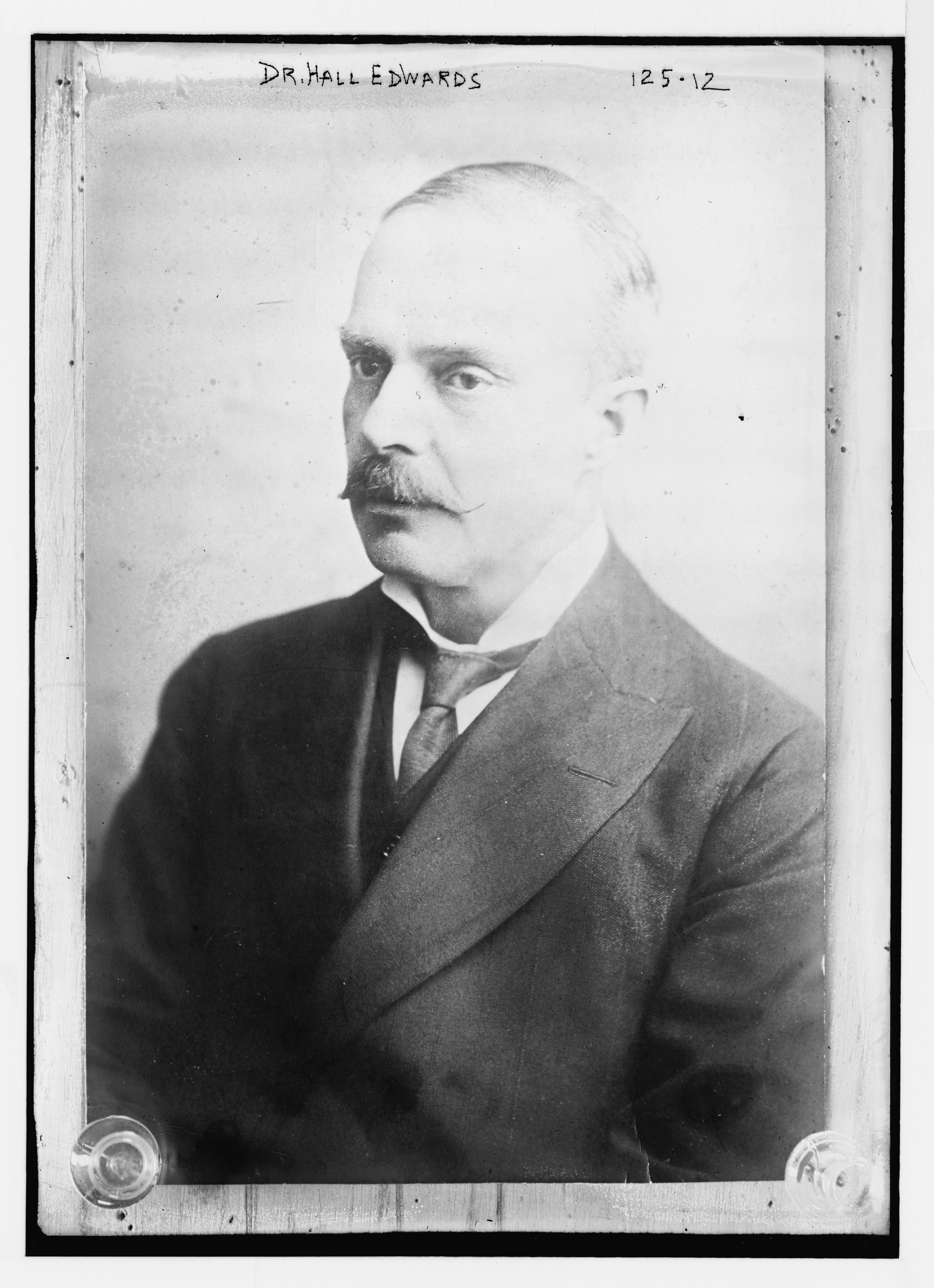
Dr. John Hall-Edwards prob. ca. 1909

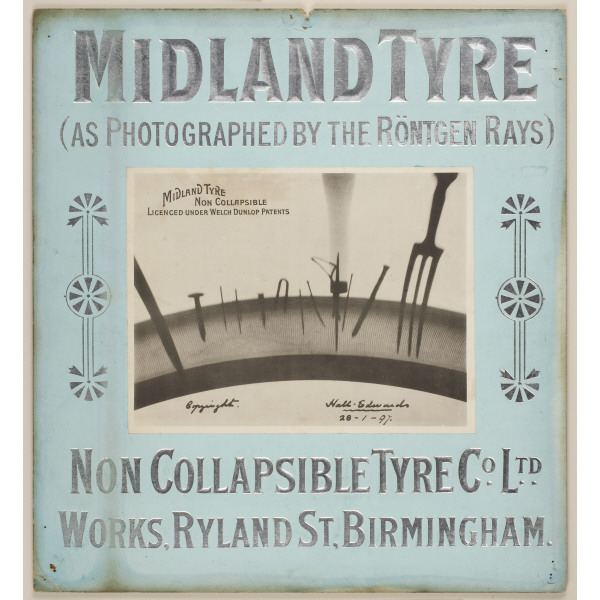
An 1897 advert for the Non-Collapsible Tyre Co. Ltd. of Ryland Street, Birmingham, using an X-ray photograph by Hall-Edwards, and bearing his signature

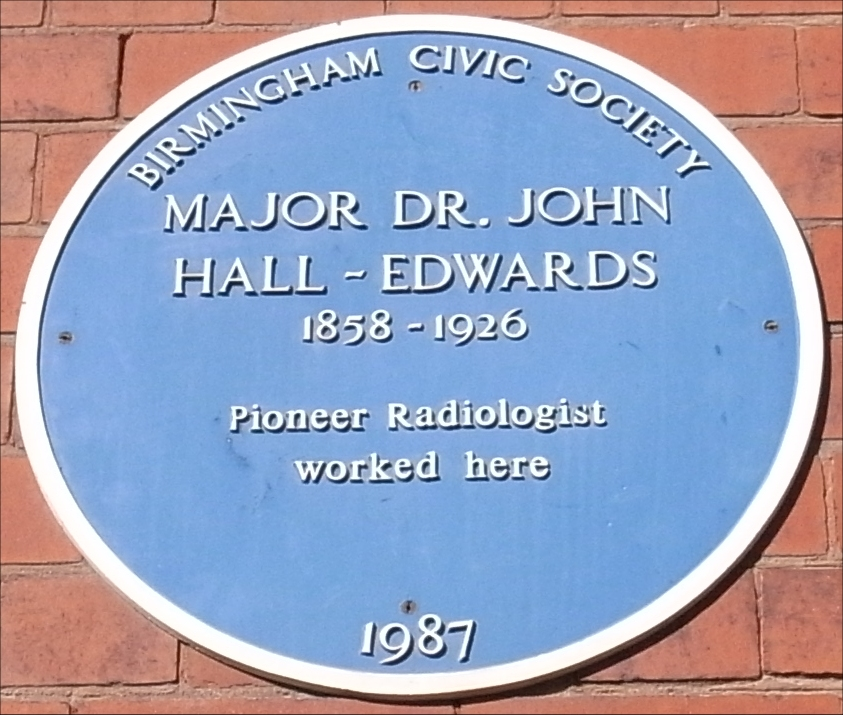
Blue plaque outside Birmingham Children's Hospital, formerly Birmingham General Hospital

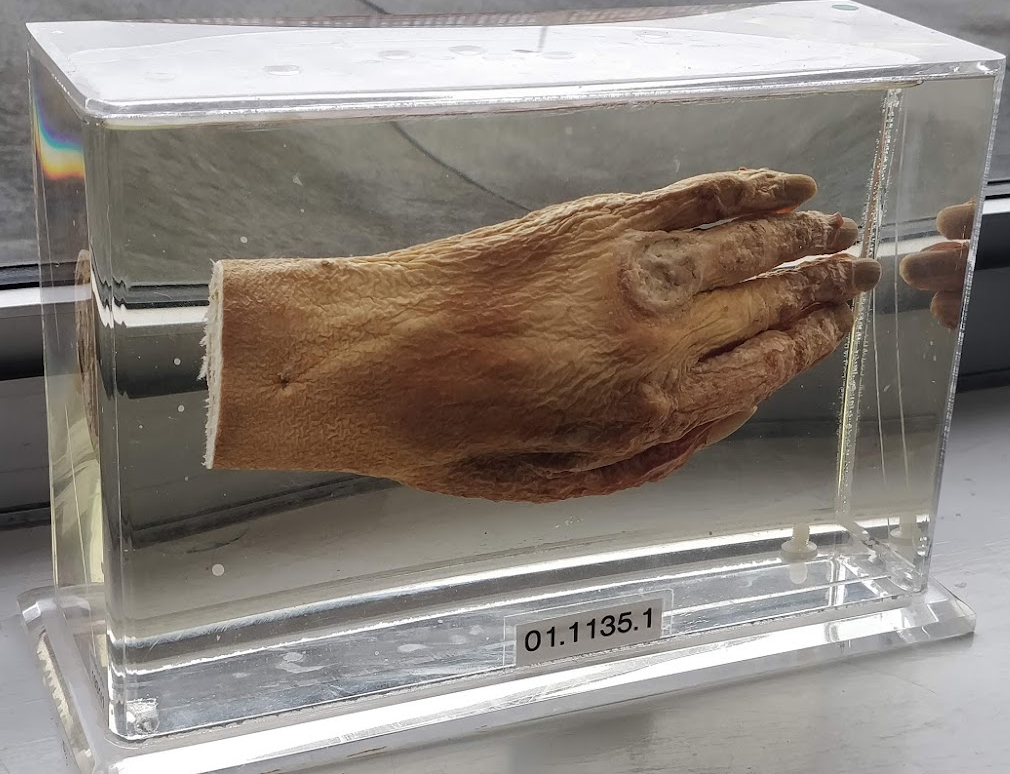
The amputated left hand of John Hall-Edwards, following extensive radiation damage.

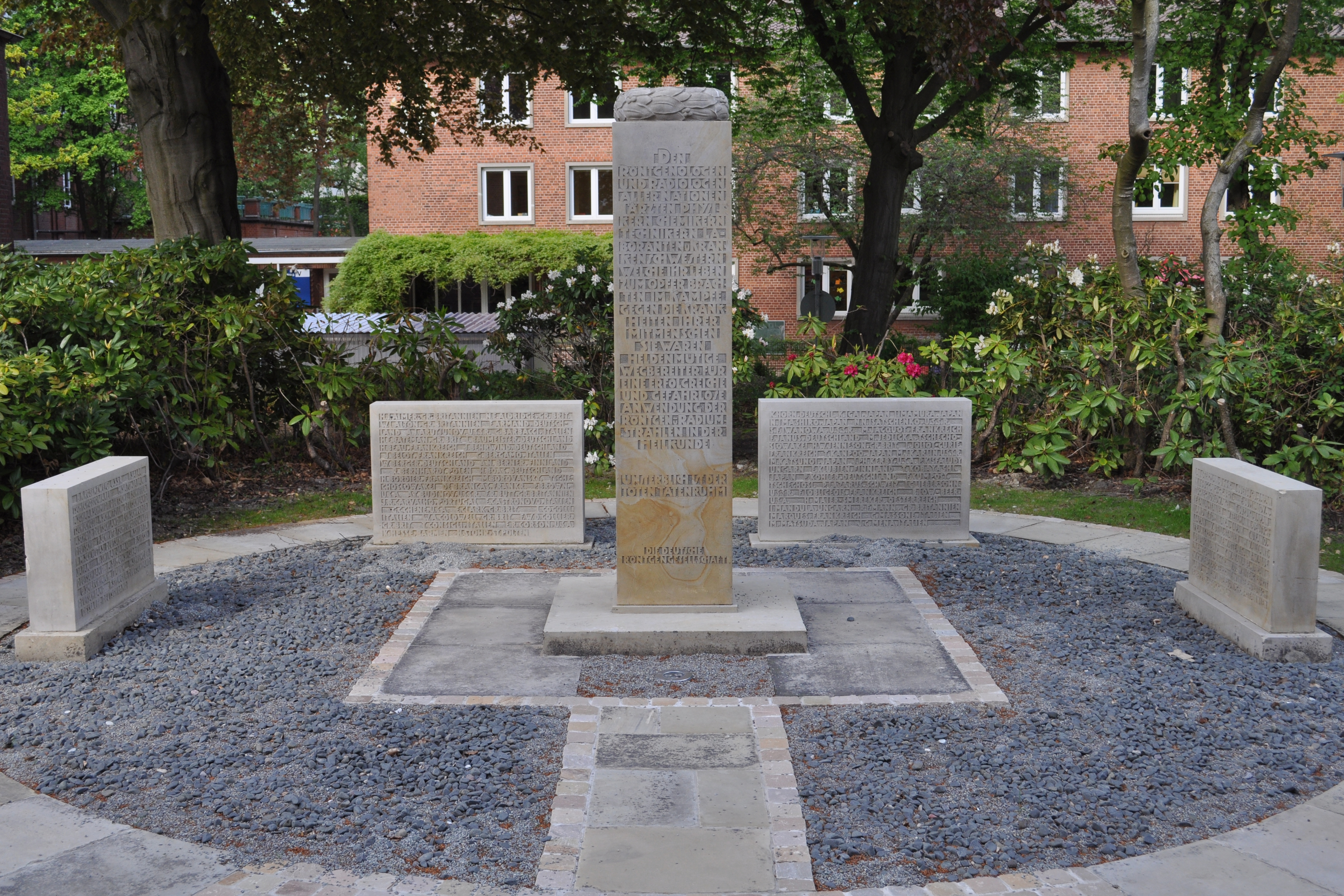
The monument to the Martyrs of Radiology in Hamburg

John Francis Hall-Edwards FRSE (19 December 1858 – 15 August 1926) was a British medical doctor and pioneer in the medical use of X-rays in the United Kingdom.

== Life ==
Hall-Edwards was the son of John Edwards, and was born on Moseley Road, Kings Norton near Birmingham. He attended King Edward VI Grammar School in Birmingham. He then studied medicine, apprenticing under Prof Richard Hill Norris at Queens College Medical School. Norris was both a surgeon and keen amateur photographer, being an early user of the dry-plate process, and he familiarised Hall-Edwards with photographic techniques. Hall-Edwards was licensed to practice medicine by the Royal College of Physicians of Edinburgh.

From around 1885 he shows a strong interest in photography and was President of the Midland Photographic Club 1891–93. In 1895 he was made an Honorary Member of the Royal Photographic Society following a lecture to the London Camera Club. Initially his work focussed on photography through microscopes.

On 11 January 1896 he made the first use of X-rays under clinical conditions when he radiographed the hand of an associate, revealing a sterilised needle beneath the surface. A month later on 14 February he took the first radiograph to direct a surgical operation. He also took the first X-ray of the human spine.

In 1899 he was made the first Surgeon Radiographer – at the General Hospital in Birmingham (also serving outlying hospitals). In February 1900 he joined the Warwickshire Regiment to act as the first military radiographer, joining them in the Boer War in South Africa, being based at both Deelfontein and Pretoria. He remained in this role for fourteen months. In 1906 he was elected first President of the British Electric-Therapeutic Society.

Hall-Edwards's interest in X-rays cost him his left arm. A cancer (then called X-ray dermatitis) was sufficiently advanced by 1904 to cause him to write papers and give public addresses on the dangers of X-rays and only then were protective measures begun. He lost his personal battle and his left arm had to be amputated at the elbow in 1908, and four fingers on his right arm soon thereafter, leaving only a thumb. His left hand is at the Birmingham University Museum as a specimen to demonstrate the effects of radiation.

He was elected a Fellow of the Royal Society of Edinburgh in 1911. His proposers were Edmond Carlier, Richard Hill Norris, Dawson Turner and Joseph Riley Ratcliffe. He served as a City Councillor in Birmingham from 1920 to 1925. He sat on the Public Health Committee and did much to promote knowledge and understanding of cancer in the medical field.

He died of cancer at his home, 112 Gough Road in Edgbaston, on 15 August 1926 aged 67. He was cremated at Birmingham Crematorium, Perry Barr.

His name was one of 169 included on the Monument to the X-ray and Radium Martyrs of All Nations erected in Hamburg, Germany in 1936.

== Publications ==
- Cancer: Its Control and Prevention (1926)

== Family ==
On Valentine's Day in 1893, Hall-Edwards married Constance Marie di Pazzi Clutton Blair Salt, daughter of the art dealer John Clutton Blair Salt.

They had one adopted daughter, Violet Primrose Bell.
