= Robert Gore =

Robert Gore may refer to:

- Robert Clements Gore (1867–1918), British Army officer
- Robert Hayes Gore (1886–1972), American politician and newspaper publisher
- Robert W. Gore (1937–2020), American engineer and scientist, inventor and businessman
- Bobby Gore (1936–2013), American gang leader and activist
- Rob Gore (born 1977), American emergency physician
- Robert Gore (MP) (1810–1854), Irish member of parliament for New Ross

== See also ==
- Gore (disambiguation)
- Sir Robert Gore-Booth, 4th Baronet (1805–1876)
