= Arthur Gore =

Arthur Gore may refer to:

== Baronets ==
- Sir Arthur Gore, 1st Baronet (c. 1640–1697), Irish MP for Mayo 1661–1666
- Sir Arthur Gore, 2nd Baronet (c. 1685–1741), Irish MP for Ballynakill, Donegal County and Mayo 1715–1742

== Earls ==
- Arthur Gore, 1st Earl of Arran (1703–1717), Irish MP for Donegal Borough
- Arthur Gore, 2nd Earl of Arran (1734–1809), Irish MP for Wexford County
- Arthur Gore, 3rd Earl of Arran (1761–1837), Irish MP for Baltimore, British MP for County Donegal
- Arthur Gore, 5th Earl of Arran (1839–1901), Anglo-Irish diplomat, Lord Lieutenant of Mayo
- Arthur Gore, 6th Earl of Arran (1868–1958), Anglo-Irish soldier, Lord Lieutenant of Donegal
- Arthur Gore, 7th Earl of Arran (1903–1958), Anglo-Irish author
- Arthur Gore, 8th Earl of Arran (1910–1983), Anglo-Irish peer
- Arthur Gore, 9th Earl of Arran (born 1938), British politician

== Others ==
- Arthur Gore (cricketer) (1866–1944), New Zealand cricketer
- Arthur Gore (priest) (1829–1913), Archdeacon of Macclesfield and Canon of Chester
- Arthur Gore (rugby league) (1891–1969), Australian rugby league footballer
- Arthur Gore (tennis) (1868–1928), British tennis player, Olympic gold medallist 1908
