= Tony Farmer =

Tony Farmer may refer to:

- Tony Farmer (football manager), English football manager
- Tony Farmer (basketball, born 1970), American basketball player
- Tony Farmer (basketball, born 1994), American basketball player

== See also ==
- Anthony Farmer (1657–?), English academic
