= William Gore =

William Gore may refer to:

- William Gore (15th-century MP) for Maldon
- Sir William Gore, 3rd Baronet (died 1700), Irish Custos Rotulorum of Leitrim
- William Gore (died 1739) (c. 1675–1739), English MP for Colchester, Cricklade and St Albans
- William Gore (Lord Mayor of London) (1644–1708), Lord Mayor of London 1701
- William Crampton Gore (1871–1946), Irish artist
- Bill Gore (1912–1986), American chemical engineer
- William Gore Ouseley (1797–1866), British diplomat
- William Gore (bishop) (died 1784), Irish Anglican bishop
- William Gore (priest) (died 1731), Church of Ireland priest
- William Gore (provost marshal) (1765–1845), British government official in Australia
- William D. Gore, Sheriff of San Diego County from 2009 to 2022
- Willem Baa Nip (1836–1885), also known as King Billy, William Gore or Billy Wa-wha, a member of the Wathaurung

== Parliament of Ireland ==
- William Gore (died 1730), MP for County Leitrim 1703–1730, Donegal Borough
- William Gore (1703–1748), MP for Kilkenny City
- William Gore (1709–1769), MP for County Leitrim 1730–1760 and 1768–1769
- William Gore (1744–1815), MP for County Leitrim 1769–1776
- William Gore (1767–1832), MP for Carrick

== See also ==
- William Ormsby-Gore (disambiguation)
