= John Gore =

John Gore may refer to:

- John Gore (MP for Malmesbury)
- John Gore (Lord Mayor) (died 1636), English merchant, Lord Mayor of London, 1624
- John Gore (Royal Navy officer, died 1790), American sailor who accompanied James Cook
- John Gore, 1st Baron Annaly (1718–1784), Irish peer and MP for Jamestown and Longford County
- John Gore (Royal Navy officer, born 1772) (1772–1836), British naval commander
- John J. Gore (1878–1939), U.S. federal judge
- John Gore (died 1773), British MP for Cricklade
- John Gore (1621–1697), British MP for Hertford
- John Gore (died 1763), British MP for Great Grimsby
- John Ellard Gore (1845–1910), Irish amateur astronomer
- Jack Gore (rugby) (1899–1971), British rugby union and rugby league footballer
- John F. Gore (born 1926), American military officer
- John Gore (theatre producer) (born 1961), British theatre producer
- John Gore (priest) (1820–1894), Anglican priest in Ireland

== See also ==
- John Ormsby-Gore, 1st Baron Harlech (1816–1876), British peer and Conservative MP for Caernarvonshire and Shropshire North
- John Gore Jones (1820–1868), Australian politician
