= Charles Gore (disambiguation) =

Charles Gore (1853–1932) was a British Anglican theologian and bishop.

Charles Gore may also refer to:

- Charles Gore (artist) (1729–1807), British artist
- Charles Gore (cricketer) (1871–1913), New Zealand cricketer, statistician, and museum curator
- Charles Gore (MP) (c.1711–1768), British landowner and politician
- Charles Knox-Gore (1831–1890), Irish baronet of the Knox-Gore baronets
- Sir Charles Gore (British Army officer) (1793–1869), British general
