= Ralph Gore =

Ralph Gore may refer to:

- Sir Ralph Gore, 2nd Baronet (died c. 1651), Irish MP for Donegal County 1639–1648
- Sir Ralph Gore, 4th Baronet (died 1733), Speaker of the Irish House of Commons, MP for Donegal Borough, Donegal County 1713–1727 and Clogher
- Ralph Gore, 1st Earl of Ross (1725–1802), his son, Irish general and MP for Donegal County 1747–1764
- Ralph Gore (Irish politician) (c. 1724–1778), Irish MP for Kilkenny City (Parliament of Ireland constituency)
