= Custos Rotulorum of Leitrim =

The Custos Rotulorum of Leitrim was the highest civil officer in County Leitrim.

== Incumbents ==
- 1684–1700 Sir William Gore, 3rd Baronet
- 1769–1777 Nathaniel Clements
- 1795–1854 Nathaniel Clements, 2nd Earl of Leitrim (died 1854)

For later custodes rotulorum, see Lord Lieutenant of Leitrim
