= Redgra =

Artificial sports and building surface

Redgra, sometimes styled as RedGra, Red-Gra, or generically as redgra, is the brand name of an all-weather surfacing material primarily composed of red clay and fine limestone gravel. It is used on baseball diamonds, running tracks and long jump run-ups, and hard-surface association football, netball, cricket, and field hockey pitches in the United Kingdom.

== History ==
Outdoor field hockey in the United Kingdom during the 1910s and 1920s often relied on heavy clay surfaces that were unplayable after heavy rain or under frost. Teams would fall back to more durable, but harsher, tarmac surfaces.

To address this, tennis court contractors Grimshaw Sports developed Redgra in 1959 by adapting the company's existing mix used for tennis courts. The limestone and clay were sourced from the Forest of Dean, Gloucestershire. The material was designed for the United Kingdom's first all-weather outdoor field hockey pitches. One of the first academic applications was opened on 4 March 1961 at Dean Close School under the recommendation of Olympic field hockey bronze medalist Denys Carnill for the school's field hockey team. A Redgra area was opened in October 1961 at the site of Harlow Sportcentre, which was completed in 1964. In 1964, the Crystal Palace National Recreation Centre included a Redgra training area and separate football practice pitch.

Redgra also saw use in other pavement applications, such as garden paths and car parks.

== Properties ==
Redgra can be applied similarly to sand, binds itself when wet and compacted, and solidifies after 24 hours. As a sports surface, Redgra allowed for year-round use with minimal maintenance in academic and practice settings, and allowed for multi-sport use as tennis courts. Its natural components were inexpensive and simple to install. A Redgra field hockey pitch installed at Cranleigh School and opened on 1 February 1968 cost £4,500 for materials and lasted until 2005. The resulting surface was porous, allowing for easy drainage, and frost-resistant. Pat Ward-Thomas, a writer for The Guardian, noted that contemporary surfaces often failed to provide smooth, precise, and predictable ball movement but praised the Redgra pitch's performance.

While competitive teams still often favored playing on well-maintained grass surfaces, Redgra surfaces sometimes substituted when rain or poor maintenance made grass unsuitable.

Redgra also saw use in playground football, youth clubs, and some women's and lower-tier men's football clubs into the 1990s. The first training pitch for Chelsea Ladies F.C. in 1992, then composed mostly of under-18 players, was a Redgra surface at a community college near Feltham.

=== Drawbacks ===
Even upon its unveiling, Redgra was considered adequate for training surfaces but questionable as a full-time competitive surface. Redgra has a reputation for causing abrasions and splinters when sliding on it compared to grass, and its hardness contributed to injuries when falling on it. When dry, the surface generated considerable amounts of red dust. The surface could become alternately sticky and slippery in frosty conditions, and if improperly drained could become muddy.

== Replacement ==
Since the 1990s, many Redgra installations for field hockey and association football have been supplanted by newer all-weather surfaces, such as artificial turf, that are more similar to natural grass or have impact-cushioning layers. However, it remains in use for public recreation tracks.

While an artificial surface, Redgra's natural components don't present the same concerns to landfills upon disposal as rubber or other synthetic surfaces.
