= Cyrioctea marken =

Scientific classification
- Kingdom: Animalia
- Phylum: Arthropoda
- Subphylum: Chelicerata
- Class: Arachnida
- Order: Araneae
- Infraorder: Araneomorphae
- Family: Zodariidae
- Genus: Cyrioctea
- Species: C. marken

Binomial name
- Cyrioctea marken Platnick & Jocqué, 1992

Species of spider

Cyrioctea marken is a species of spider in the family Zodariidae. It is endemic to Limpopo province of South Africa.

== Etymology ==
The species is named after the type locality Marken in Limpopo Province.

== Distribution ==
Cyrioctea marken is known from three localities in Limpopo: Elsrus in Marken, Goro Game Ranch near Vivo, and Lhuvhondo Nature Reserve in the Western Soutpansberg.

== Habitat ==
The species occurs at altitudes ranging from 1001 to 1341 m above sea level in the Savanna biome. Specimens have been collected from pitfall traps in loose sand.

== Description ==
Male Cyrioctea marken have a total length of 6-7 mm. The carapace is almost diamond-shaped and very narrow in the eye region. Both the carapace and legs are brown. A distinctive feature is the presence of eight ocular spines, with the inner four being enlarged. The legs are long, with the front leg being the longest.

== Conservation ==
The species is listed as Data Deficient because the female is unknown and its status remains unclear. It is protected in Lhuvhondo Nature Reserve and Goro Game Ranch, but more sampling is needed to collect females and determine the species' true range.
