= Richard Hill Norris =

British physiologist, spiritualist and photographer

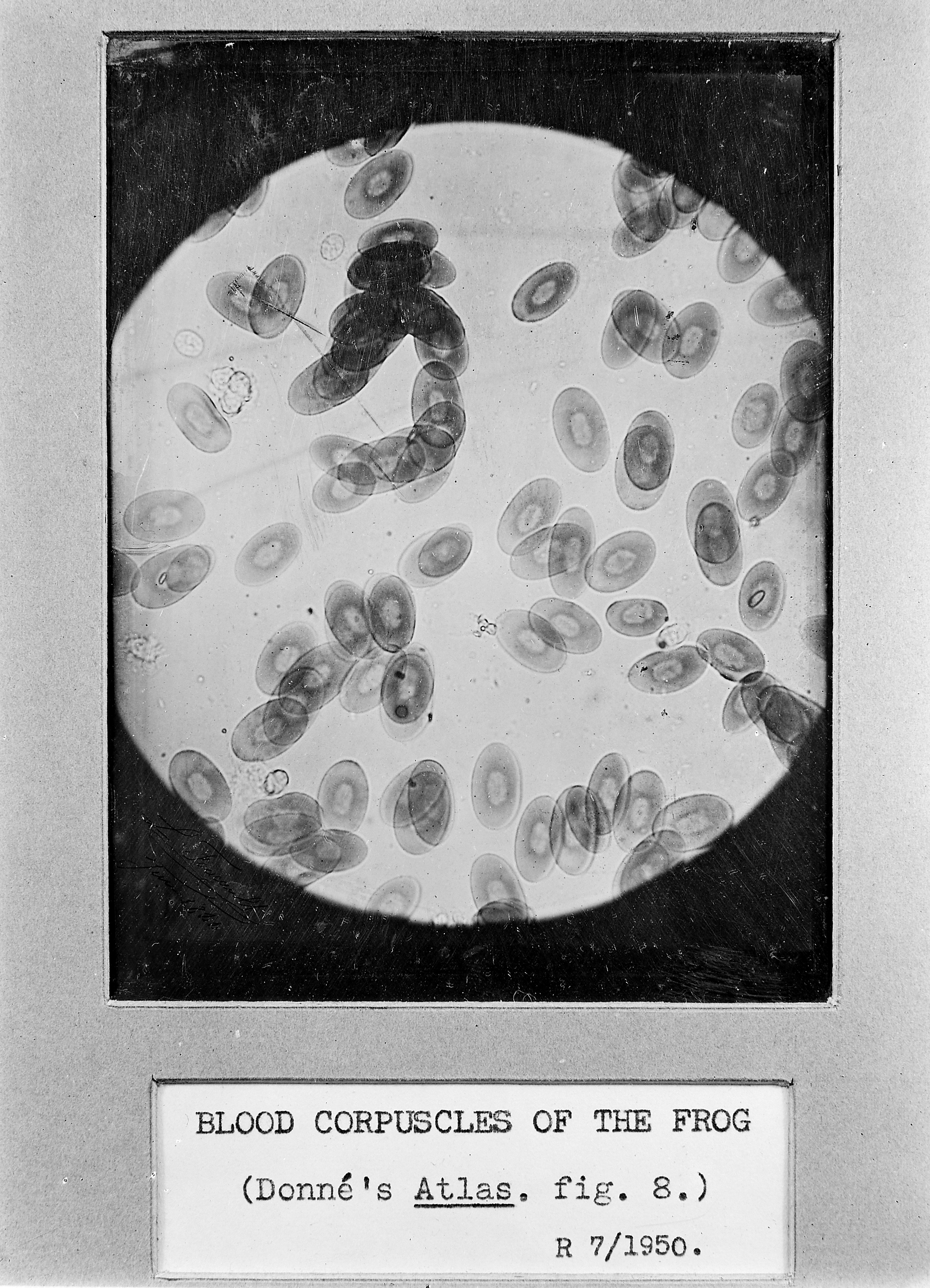
Blood corpuscles of a frog

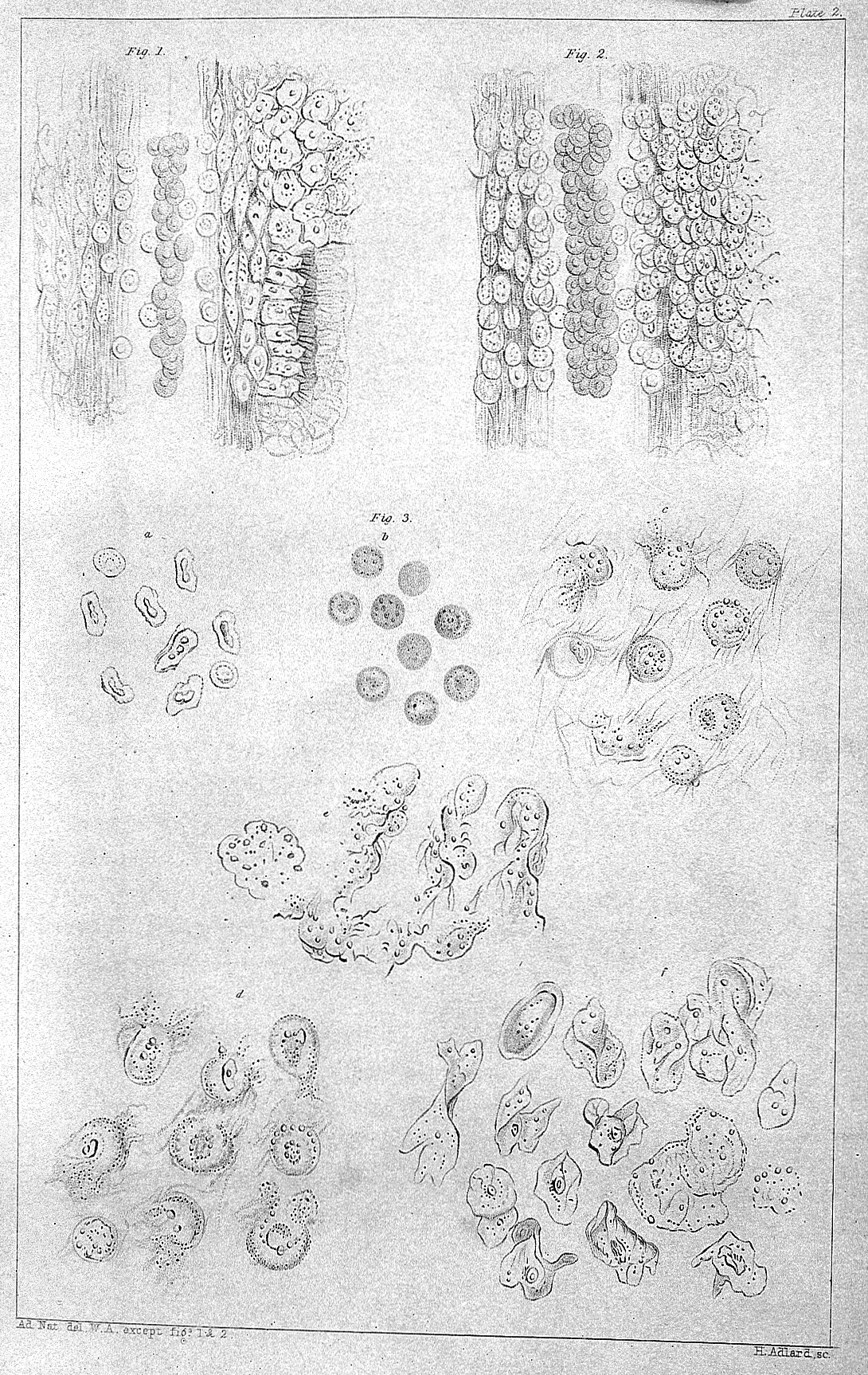
Diagrams of blood corpuscles based on early microphotography

Richard Hill Norris FRSE FRSGS (1830–1916) was a British physiologist, spiritualist and photographer. From the 1880s he began microscopic photography of blood corpuscles and was a pioneer of micrography. In 1856 he invented the dry collodion photographic plate.

== Life ==
Norris studied medicine at the University of Edinburgh. He developed an early interest in microphotography; mainly taking pictures of frogs' blood. In 1856 he invented the first dry collodion photographic plate, and in 1858 founded founding the Patent Dry Collodion Plate Company in Birmingham - one of the first commercial producers of photographic materials in the world.

From 1862 to 1891, he was Professor of Physiology at Queens College in Birmingham.

In 1878, he was elected a Fellow of the Royal Society of Edinburgh, proposed by Sir Thomas Richard Fraser, John Gray McKendrick, Alexander Dickson and Alexander Buchan. He was President of the Birmingham Philosophical Society.

In April 1882, he complained to The Lancet that Giulio Bizzozero had plagiarised pieces of his work.

He was still patenting photographic processes in 1888. In December 1890 he went into partnership with Harold William Southall of Edgbaston, founding the Birmingham Dry Collodion Plate and Film Company. Together they built a sizeable factory in Yardley, Birmingham which began production in 1893. However, this company failed and was liquidated in 1895.

Norris was also involved in microscopic studies of metals heating and cooling together with George Gore at the Institute of Scientific Research in Birmingham.

His personal interests extended deeply into spiritualism, considering himself an amateur medium, and becoming involved in seances and automatic writing. He believed in allopsychism, mesmerism and hypnotism, Engaging in studies of Christine Beauchamp. He did not publish any of his thoughts on spiritualism, but corresponded with several parties such as Alfred Russel Wallace, William Crookes, Emma Hardinge and Samuel Guppy.

== Family ==
In 1852 he was married to Ann (1827-1901). Their son Richard Hill Norris (1853-1919) was also a doctor. Other sons included Arthur Kingsley Norris and Benjamin Stuart Norris. His brother was Joseph Norris, Victorian photographer.

== Publications ==
- On Stasis of Blood and Exudation (1862)
- On the Laws and Principles Concerned in the Aggregation of Blood Corpuscles (1869)
- On the Extrusion of the Morphological Elements of the Blood (1871)
- On the Physical Principles Concerned in the Passage of Blood Corpuscles through the Walls of the Vessels (1871)
- The Physiology and Pathology of the Blood (1882)
