= Gorer (surname) =

Gorer is a surname. Notable people with the surname include:

- Geoffrey Gorer (1905–1985), British anthropologist and author
- Peter Alfred Gorer (1907–1961), British immunologist, pathologist, and geneticist

== See also ==
- Gore (surname), a similarly spelled surname
