= Tony Farmer (football manager) =

Former English football manager

Managerial career
- Years: Team
- 1992–1997: Chelsea Ladies

Tony Farmer is the founder and inaugural manager of women's association football club Chelsea F.C. Women, then called Chelsea Ladies F.C. He successfully petitioned Chelsea F.C. to create the club in 1992, which installed him as its first manager, a role he served in until 1997. During his time as manager, Farmer recruited youth players to the team who would become prominent England national team players and the foundations of Chelsea's early top-flight competitions, including Fara Williams and Casey Stoney. He also led Chelsea's women's side to its first league championships and promotions.

== Managing career ==
In the early 1990s, Farmer coached youth clubs in the London area, including women's squads at Crystal Palace and Bedfont United.

=== Chelsea Ladies F.C., 1992–1997 ===
Farmer was a longtime supporter of men's association football club Chelsea F.C. but gained an interest in women's football when his girlfriend Val Lightfoot joined Crystal Palace.

In 1992, Farmer wrote a letter to Chelsea F.C. to propose adding a women's side, which the club had not done since the 1970s, to help rehabilitate the club's reputation with the broader public.

Upon approval, Farmer lobbied for the club to be featured in men's match programmes for promotion and began recruiting youth players to the club, including many from his former team Bedfont United. At the time players had to pay to play the team, and its training grounds were a redgra surface at a community college near Feltham. The team later trained at Cranford Community School. Its first home pitch was Hurlingham Park in Fulham.

Farmer managed his first match with Chelsea Ladies on 4 October 1992, in the Greater London Women's Football League, which Chelsea won 4–0. The club finished the season a point out of promotion from the league's third division and eliminated from league cup contention, but rebounded in the 1993–94 season undefeated and were promoted directly to the league's first division. As a reward the men's side invited the women to appear at halftime of its penultimate home match in the nascent Premier League, where the stadium gave the women's side a standing ovation, and provided Farmer with a £3,000 budget to cover the club's costs.

In 1994, Farmer recruited a 12-year-old Casey Stoney to Chelsea. In 1996, Farmer recruited Fara Williams at age 12 to the club's under-14s. Forward Julie Newell scored more than 80 goals in her first 50 appearances for the club.

The club was promoted again to the league's premier division in 1995. By Farmer's resignation in 1997, the club had won promotion again to join the FA Women's National League Southern Division.

== After football ==
Farmer was invited as guest of honor to the Women's Super League (WSL) match against Sunderland that clinched Chelsea Women's first WSL title in 2015. The match was on 4 October 2015, the 23rd anniversary of Farmer's first match, and also ended in a 4–0 Chelsea victory.

In 2017, Farmer organized a protest against the WSL's proposed restructuring and published an open letter to The FA's head of women's leagues Katie Brazier. Farmer's complaints centered around the restructuring's preference of clubs that were already well-funded over long-tenured clubs that had won entry to the top flight on results. The protest ultimately failed, and The FA's restructuring resulted in the demotion of WSL 2 champions Sunderland and WSL 2 club Blackburn Rovers and the promotion of lower-division clubs such as Manchester United and West Ham United, all on financial grounds.
