= Cyrioctea =

Scientific classification
- Kingdom: Animalia
- Phylum: Arthropoda
- Subphylum: Chelicerata
- Class: Arachnida
- Order: Araneae
- Infraorder: Araneomorphae
- Family: Zodariidae
- Genus: Cyrioctea; Simon, 1889

Type species
- Cyrioctea spinifera

Species
- 14, see text

Genus of spiders

Cyrioctea is a genus of spiders in the family Zodariidae, first described in 1889 by Eugène Simon. It contains fourteen species, found in Africa, South America, and Australia.

== Distribution ==
The genus has a Gondwanan distribution, with species found in South America, Africa and Australia, indicating the genus emerged before Gondwana split up.

== Species ==
As of September 2025, this genus includes fourteen species:

- Cyrioctea aschaensis Schiapelli & Gerschman, 1942 – Argentina
- Cyrioctea calderoni Platnick, 1986 – Chile
- Cyrioctea cruz Platnick, 1986 – Chile
- Cyrioctea griswoldorum Platnick & Jocqué, 1992 – Namibia
- Cyrioctea hirsuta Platnick & Griffin, 1988 – Namibia
- Cyrioctea islachanaral Grismado & Pizarro-Araya, 2016 – Chile
- Cyrioctea lotzi Jocqué, 2013 – South Africa
- Cyrioctea marken Platnick & Jocqué, 1992 – South Africa
- Cyrioctea mauryi Platnick, 1986 – Chile
- Cyrioctea namibensis Platnick & Griffin, 1988 – Namibia
- Cyrioctea raveni Platnick & Griffin, 1988 – Australia (Queensland)
- Cyrioctea sawadee Jocqué, 2013 – South Africa
- Cyrioctea spinifer (Nicolet, 1849) – Chile (type species)
- Cyrioctea whartoni Platnick & Griffin, 1988 – Namibia
