= Billy Gore =

Wales international rugby union & league footballer

Personal information
- Full name: William Gore
- Born: 19 November 1919 Blaina, Wales
- Died: 13 April 2010 (aged 90) Nevill Hall Hospital, Abergavenny, Wales

Playing information

Rugby union
- Position: Hooker
Club
Years	Team	Pld	T	G	FG	P
≤1943–≥43	Newbridge RFC
Representative
Years	Team	Pld	T	G	FG	P
1947	Wales	3	0	0	0	0

Rugby league
- Position: Hooker
Club
Years	Team	Pld	T	G	FG	P
Nov 1943–47	St Helens RLFC	1	0	0	0	0
Sep 1947	Warrington	1
	Total	2	0	0	0	0
- Father: Jack Gore

William Gore (19 November 1919 – 13 April 2010) was a Welsh rugby union, and professional rugby league footballer who played in the 1940s. He played representative level rugby union (RU) for Wales, and at club level for Newbridge RFC, as a hooker, and club level rugby league (RL) for St Helens, Warrington, as a hooker.

== Outside of rugby ==
Billy Gore was born in Blaina, Wales he worked as a foundryman while playing for Newbridge RFC, he became a landlord of public house(s), he was a lifelong Labour Party supporter, and was elected as a Councillor, he became chairman of Gwent County Council, and Mayor of Nantyglo, and he died aged 90 in Nevill Hall Hospital, Abergavenny, Wales.

== International honours ==
Billy Gore won caps for Wales (RU) while at Newbridge RFC in 1947 against Scotland, France, and Ireland.

== Genealogical Information ==
Billy Gore was the son of the rugby union, and rugby league footballer who played in the 1920s; Jack Gore.
