= Gore-Browne =

Gore-Browne, a British double-barrelled name, may refer to:

- Eric Gore-Browne (1890–1918), English cricketer and British Army officer
- Harold Gore Browne (1856–1938), British army officer
- Henry Gore-Browne (1830–1912), Victoria Cross recipient
- Stewart Gore-Browne (1883–1967), soldier, pioneer settler, and politician and supporter of independence in Northern Rhodesia
- Thomas Gore Browne (1807–1887), fourth Governor General of New Zealand
- Wilfrid Gore Browne (1859–1928), African Anglican bishop

== Others ==
- Gore Browne (died 1843), British army officer

== See also ==
- Gore (surname)
- Browne (surname)
