= William Ormsby-Gore =

William Ormsby-Gore may refer to:

- William Ormsby-Gore (1779–1860), MP for County Leitrim, Caernarvon and North Shropshire
- William Ormsby-Gore, 2nd Baron Harlech (1819–1904), MP for Sligo in the British Parliament (1841–1852)
- William Ormsby-Gore, 4th Baron Harlech (1885–1964), British MP and Cabinet Minister

== See also ==
- William Gore (disambiguation)
