= Paul Gore =

Paul Gore may refer to:

- Paul Annesley Gore (c.1703–1780), Irish politician
- Paul Gore-Booth, Baron Gore-Booth (1909–1984), British banker, diplomat, and life peer
- Paul Gore (historian) (1875–1927), Bessarabian politician, historian, and writer
- Sir Paul Gore, 1st Baronet (1567–1629), Anglo-Irish politician and soldier
