= George Gore (disambiguation) =

George Gore (1857–1933) was an American baseball player.

George Gore may also refer to:

- George Gore (electrochemist) (1826–1908), English chemist
- George Gore (judge) (1675–1753), Irish lawyer
- George O. Gore II (born 1982), American actor
- George W. Gore, president of Florida A & M University
- George Gore (priest), Anglican priest in Ireland
