= Cyrioctea sawadee =

Scientific classification
- Kingdom: Animalia
- Phylum: Arthropoda
- Subphylum: Chelicerata
- Class: Arachnida
- Order: Araneae
- Infraorder: Araneomorphae
- Family: Zodariidae
- Genus: Cyrioctea
- Species: C. sawadee

Binomial name
- Cyrioctea sawadee Jocqué, 2013

Species of spider

Cyrioctea sawadee is a species of spider in the family Zodariidae. It is endemic to the Western Cape province of South Africa.

== Distribution ==
Cyrioctea sawadee is known only from Sawadee Guesthouse in the Cederberg Wilderness Area.

== Habitat ==
The species occurs at approximately 431 m above sea level in the Fynbos biome. Specimens have been collected using pitfall traps.

== Description ==
Male Cyrioctea sawadee have a brownish-yellow carapace with a black fovea and dark margin. The palp, chelicerae, mouthparts, and sternum are pale brown, while the legs are yellow with femora suffused with dark grey. The opisthosoma is pale grey with a distinctive dark pattern consisting of a central spot followed by four transverse bands. The venter is medium grey, darkening towards the yellow spinnerets.

== Conservation ==
The species is listed as Data Deficient because the female remains unknown and it is known only from the type locality. It is protected in the Cederberg Wilderness Area, but more sampling is needed to collect females and determine the species' true range.
