= Arthur Gore (cricketer) =

New Zealand cricketer (1866–1944)

Personal information
- Full name: Arthur Hector Gore
- Born: 1866; Wellington, New Zealand
- Died: 29 September 1944 (aged 77–78); Vancouver, Canada
- Bowling: Right-arm leg-spin
- Relatives: Charles Gore (brother); Ross Gore (brother)

Domestic team information
- Years: Team
- 1885/86–1888/89: Wellington
- 1891/92–1901/02: Hawke's Bay

Career statistics
Competition	First-class
Matches	26
Runs scored	443
Batting average	10.54
100s/50s	0/0
Top score	42
Balls bowled	3,196
Wickets	89
Bowling average	15.10
5 wickets in innings	6
10 wickets in match	1
Best bowling	7/53
Catches/stumpings	18/–
- Source: Cricinfo, 17 January 2017

Arthur Hector Gore (1866 – 29 September 1944) was a New Zealand cricketer who played first-class cricket from 1886 to 1902.

== Family ==
Arthur Gore was one of eight children – four sons and four daughters – of Richard Benjamin Gore, who was curator of the Colonial Museum in Wellington, Government Meteorological Observer and Statistician, and Secretary to the Geological Survey Department, the New Zealand Institute and the Wellington Philosophical Society. Arthur's younger brothers Charles and Ross were, like him, first-class cricketers. Ross and Arthur's other brother Henry were also, like Arthur, prominent tennis players in New Zealand.

Arthur married a widow, Rachel (Mrs Ulick Burke), in Wellington on 30 June 1891. She had been widowed in 1886 with young children.

== Cricket career ==
=== For Wellington ===
A leg-spin bowler and hard-hitting batsman, Arthur Gore played for the Wellington club in the Wellington senior cricket competition. In November 1888, playing against Stars, he took 6 for 10 to dismiss them for 17. Playing interprovincial cricket for the Wellington representative team against Hawke's Bay in 1886–87, he opened the bowling and took 7 for 53 and, bowling unchanged throughout the second innings, 6 for 38, as well as scoring 33 opening the batting, in an innings victory for Wellington. In another innings victory for Wellington two seasons later he took 4 for 25 (bowling unchanged throughout the innings) and 4 for 16 against Nelson.

=== For Hawke's Bay ===
When Gore moved to Napier he played for the County club. In 1891–92, in his first match for Hawke's Bay, Gore took 2 for 21 and 6 for 26 (unchanged through the innings again) against Taranaki, as well as hitting the top score of 33 in a low-scoring match that Hawke's Bay won by 10 wickets.

In 1893-94 he captained Hawke's Bay on their three-match southern tour, when they played first-class matches against Otago (when he took four wickets), Canterbury (eight wickets) and Wellington (six wickets) in late March and early April 1894. In an otherwise unsuccessful tour for Hawke's Bay, he took 18 wickets at an average of 14.77.

He helped Hawke's Bay to an innings victory in their first match of 1900-01 when, after not bowling in the first innings, he took 6 for 44 against Auckland, bowling three batsmen around their legs. Later in the season he took 6 for 55 in the second innings in a close draw against Wellington.

== Work career ==
Gore moved to Napier in 1889 to be the local representative of the Australian Mutual Provident Society. In early 1897 he left AMP and returned to Wellington, where, like his father, he worked at the Colonial Museum.
