= Arthur Gore (rugby league) =

Australian rugby league footballer

Personal information
- Full name: Arthur Charles Montague Gore
- Born: 1891; Woollahra, New South Wales, Australia
- Died: 15 April 1969 (age 78); Kogarah, New South Wales, Australia

Playing information
- Position: Hooker
Club
| Years | Team | Pld | T | G | FG | P |
|---|---|---|---|---|---|---|
| 1922–23 | St. George | 27 | 0 | 1 | 0 | 2 |

Arthur Gore (1891–1969) was an Australian rugby league footballer who played in the 1920s for St. George.

A local junior from the Arncliffe Waratahs, Gore was graded in 1922 and played two seasons during the foundation years of the St. George. He was a handy hooker who held his position in the team until his retirement in 1923, age 32.

Gore died on 15 April 1969 at Kogarah, New South Wales.
