= Rob Gore =

American medical academic

- Born: 1977 (age 48–49)
- Education: Morehouse College ('98); State University of New York ('02)
- Employer(s): Kings County Hospital Center, Brooklyn, New York, U.S.
- Known for: Emergency Medicine
- Website: https://kavibrooklyn.org/

Robert (Rob) Gore (born 1977) is an American emergency physician and the founder of the Kings Against Violence Initiative (KAVI). He is a clinical assistant professor at Kings County Hospital Center in Brooklyn, New York. He was an inaugural TED Resident in 2016, and in 2018 named a CNN Hero.

== Early life and education ==
Gore grew up in Brooklyn. He is the son of a community activist and a teacher. He studied at Morehouse College and graduated in 1998. He attended University at Buffalo School of Medicine and Biomedical Sciences and graduated in 2002. He was a Chief Medical Resident at John H. Stroger Jr. Hospital of Cook County.

== Career ==
Gore has worked with Clinique Espérance et Vie, a medical clinic in Haiti that supports Terrier-Rouge and nearby areas, since 2008. He launched a crowdfunding campaign to translate their activities into a television series, The Global Empowerment Project. He collaborated with Marc Baptise and Brian Paupaw.

Gore founded the SUNY Downstate Medical Center Minority Medical Student Emergency Medicine (MMSEM) Summer Fellowship - a mentoring program for underrepresented minorities in medicine. Gore believes that violence is a public health problem. In 2009 he founded the Kings Against Violence Initiative (KAVI), an in-school, hospital and community non-profit anti-violence program that looks to teach young people how to resolve conflicts peacefully. He developed a team of Hospital Responders, people who can respond sensitively to challenging situations that occur in a community. Gore ran a series of breakfast meetings to help young black people diffuse disputes. The program grew in 2011, with Gore encouraging his family, colleagues and friends to take part. KAVI is part of NYC Health + Hospitals with similar initiatives in Harlem and The Bronx. He was chosen as one of 2018 Presidential Leadership Scholars. The program is supported by the George W. Bush Presidential Center and Clinton Presidential Center. During his scholarship, Gore worked on a proposal to increase impact and resource for KAVI.

In 2016 he delivered a Ted Talk titled Healing Inner-City Trauma. He was a TED resident in the inaugural program in 2016. He discussed KAVI on History NOW in 2016. His achievements were honoured by the United Hospital Fund in 2017. That year he was selected as one of Black Enterprise's 100 Men of Distinction. He was selected as a CNN Hero in 2018. He was awarded the Citizens' Committee for Children Vanguard Award for his work serving at-risk youth. He is represented by the Serendipity Literary Agency.

Gore's first book, Treating Violence, was released on May 7, 2024, through Beacon Press publishing.
