= Goehr =

Göhr (also spelled as Goehr or Gohr) is a surname of German language origin. Notable people with this name include:

Goehr

- Alexander Goehr (1932–2024), English composer and academic, son of Walter
- Lydia Goehr (born 1960), English philosopher
- Walter Goehr (1903–1960), German composer, father of Alexander

Gohr

- Arnold Gohr (1896–1983), German trade unionist, activist, and politician
- Else Schmitz-Gohr (1901–1987) German composer and pianist
- Greg Gohr (born 1967), American baseball pitcher

Göhr

- Marlies Göhr (born 1958), German athlete
