= Reg Gore =

English footballer (1913–1996)

Personal information
- Date of birth: 1 August 1913
- Place of birth: Clay Cross, England
- Date of death: 8 December 1996 (aged 83)
- Place of death: Mansfield, England
- Position: Forward

Youth career
- Willamthorpe Colliery

Senior career*
Years	Team	Apps	(Gls)
1932–1933	Chesterfield	0	(0)
1933–1934	Birmingham	0	(0)
1934–1935	Southport	16	(2)
1935–1936	South Liverpool		
1936–1937	Rhyl Athletic		
1937–1938	Frickley Colliery		
1938–1942	West Ham United	5	(1)
1941–1947	St Mirren		
1947–1948	Cowdenbeath		
- * Club domestic league appearances and goals

Reginald Gore (1 August 1913 – 8 December 1996) was an English professional footballer who played as a forward.

== Career ==
Born in Clay Cross, Gore played for his local colliery club before being signed as a professional by Chesterfield but never made a first team appearance for the club. He next moved to Birmingham where he again failed to make a first team appearance before transferring to Southport, where he made his Football League debut. He then fell back into non-league football before impressing whilst at Midland League club Frickley Colliery in an exhibition game against West Ham and was signed by the London club where he again played in the Football League. During the war he made guest appearances for West Ham and St Mirren for who he later signed professionally following the war.

== Cricket ==
Gore also played cricket alongside his professional football career, playing for Clay Cross and Ferguslie.
