= Michael Gore (disambiguation) =

Michael Gore (born 1951) is an American composer.

Michael Gore may also refer to:

- Michael Edward John Gore (1935–2022), British diplomat and governor of the Cayman Islands
- Michael Gore (MP) for Portsmouth (UK Parliament constituency)
- Mike Gore (theater owner) (1878–1953), American film theater owner
- Mike Gore (physicist) (1934–2022), professor at the Australian National University
