= James Howard Gore =

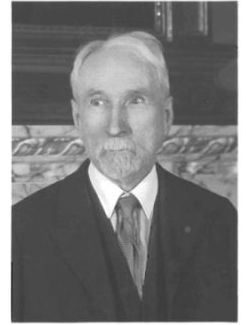
James Howard Gore

James Howard Gore (September 18, 1856 – June 10, 1939) was professor of mathematics at The Corcoran Scientific School (which became the George Washington University School of Engineering and Applied Science). In 1905, Gore was the head of the mathematics department and taught a majority of the undergraduate and graduate courses. He is the author of nearly 20 books covering topics including mathematics, geodesy, European politics, travel and art. Much of his writing was influenced by his time spent in Berlin, Leyden, and Brussels, where he completed his post-graduate studies. Gore was also a member of several European royal societies such as Commandeur of the Order of Leopold (Belgium), a member of the Order of the Crown (Belgium) and a member of the Order of Orange-Nassau. Each of these societies are related to the royal parties of Belgium and the Netherlands and are generally bestowed upon individuals who have demonstrated dedication and commitment towards these respective areas.

== History ==
James Howard Gore was born to Mahlon Gore and Sydney Cather in Frederick County, Virginia. Growing up, he lived on a farm with his family. At the age of four, his father died. From this point on, his mother took on the responsibility of raising Gore and his two brothers, with whom he shared farm chores. From an early age, Gore displayed interest in the sciences and mathematics and often read scientific literature. Gore took his education very seriously and chose to attend the Hamilton Academy, Richmond College, and finally Columbian University (now George Washington University). Gore also took time abroad and performed his post graduate studies in Berlin, Leyden and Brussels from 1894 through 1897. However, it was in 1877 that Gore graduated from Columbian University but remained there as a tutor. Thus began his profession of teaching. During 1878–1881 he served as a tutor at Columbian University in mathematics; during 1881–1883 Gore served as an adjunct professor of mathematics at Columbian University; in 1884–1887 he was professor of mathematics and geodesy at the Corcoran Scientific School at the George Washington University; during 1884–1909 Gore was a respected professor at the Corcoran Scientific school until his retirement; in 1888 he received an honorary doctorate from Columbian University; and during 1909–1939 Gore was a professor emeritus until his death in 1939. Throughout his time teaching at George Washington University, Gore lived not too far away in a neighborhood frequented by today's students in Friendship Heights, Maryland. On July 20, 1889, Gore married Lillian van Sparrendahl and they had one child. He died on June 10, 1939, at the age of 82. George Washington University continues to preserve materials from his days as a professor.

== Publications ==
Outside of his teaching career, Gore wrote several publications, including Geodesy; Elements of Geodesy; History of Geodesy; Physical Geography; Parliamentary Law; German Science Reader; Editor of German Texts; Political Parties and Party Policies in Germany; Dutch Art as Seen by a Layman; How to See Holland; Holland as Seen by an American; Legionnaires: A Directory of the Citizens of the United States of whom France has conferred her National Order, the Legion of Honor.
