= Ross Gore =

New Zealand sportsman (1869–1925)

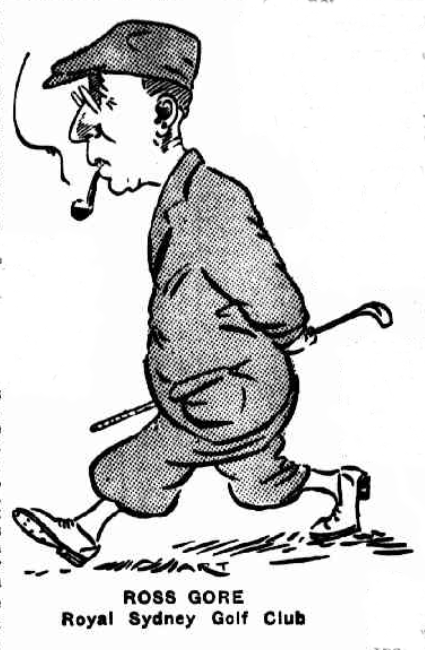
- Newspaper caricature of Ross Gore in 1921

Personal information
- Born: 2 July 1869; Wellington, New Zealand
- Died: 25 November 1925 (aged 56); Rose Bay, New South Wales, Australia
- Batting: Right-handed
- Relatives: Arthur Gore (brother); Charles Gore (brother)

Domestic team information
- Years: Team
- 1896/97: Wellington

Career statistics
Competition	First-class
Matches	1
Runs scored	19
Batting average	9.50
100s/50s	0/0
Top score	17
Catches/stumpings	0/–
- Source: Cricinfo, 2 October 2020

Ross Gore (2 July 1869 – 25 November 1925) was a New Zealand sportsman.

== Life and career ==
=== In New Zealand ===
Ross Gore was one of eight children – four sons and four daughters – of Richard Benjamin Gore, who was curator of the Colonial Museum in Wellington, Government Meteorological Observer and Statistician, and Secretary to the Geological Survey Department, the New Zealand Institute and the Wellington Philosophical Society. Ross's brothers Arthur and Charles were, like him, first-class cricketers. All four brothers were prominent tennis players in New Zealand.

Gore won the long jump at the New Zealand Athletic Championships in February 1893, setting a New Zealand record with a jump of 21 feet and half an inch (6.413 metres). In 1894 he represented Wellington in inter-provincial tennis. He competed in the New Zealand Tennis Championships in 1891, 1893, 1894 and 1895, winning four of his eight matches. He played one match of first-class cricket as a batsman for Wellington in December 1896, but was not successful. He was runner-up in the 1897 New Zealand Amateur golf championship, played at Auckland Golf Club, losing to David Pryde in the final.

=== In Australia ===
Gore worked for the AMP Society in Wellington for 12 years before moving to Australia in 1897, where he worked for AMP in Melbourne. He moved to Brisbane in 1905, working for the Equitable Life Insurance Society.

He was appointed secretary of Royal Sydney Golf Club in 1907, and remained in the position until his death in 1925. He also served as secretary of the Golf Union of Australia. He represented New South Wales in the Australian Men's Interstate Teams Matches at Royal Adelaide in 1923. Gore was also one of the leading figures in the development of the tourist resort at Mount Kosciuszko.

Gore was a prominent organiser of patriotic activities in Sydney during World War I, especially the War Chest Fund, of which he was honorary organiser. He was also chairman of the New South Wales Recruiting Committee.

He died at his home, "Te Puke", in Kent Road in the Sydney suburb of Rose Bay, after a long illness. He was survived by his wife Alma and their son and daughter. Their home backed on to the fairways of Royal Sydney Golf Club. In 2011, another New Zealander, Russell Crowe, bought it for A$10 million.
