= Sir Ralph Gore, 2nd Baronet =

Anglo-Irish politician

Sir Ralph Gore, 2nd Baronet (died 1661) was an Anglo-Irish politician, soldier and baronet.

He was the eldest son of Sir Paul Gore, 1st Baronet and Isabella Wycliffe, daughter of Francis Wycliffe. Gore succeeded his father as baronet in 1629. He was Member of Parliament (MP) in the Irish House of Commons for County Donegal from 1639 until 1648. In the Irish Rebellion of 1641, he was appointed colonel of 500 men by King Charles I of England to end the riots.

On 23 April 1639, he married Anne Caulfeild, second daughter of the 2nd Baron Caulfeild of Charlemont. Gore was succeeded in the baronetcy by his only son William.

Baronetage of Ireland
Preceded by Paul Gore	Baronet (of Magherabegg); 1629–1661	Succeeded by William Gore
