= Francis Gore (disambiguation) =

Francis Gore was a British officer.

Francis Gore may also refer to:

- Francis Gore (cricketer) (1855–1938), English cricketer and British Army officer
- Sir Francis Charles Gore (1846–1940), British barrister
- Sir Francis Knox-Gore, 1st Baronet (1803–1873)
- Francis Ormsby-Gore, 6th Baron Harlech (1954–2016), peer in the United Kingdom

== See also ==
- Frank Gore (born 1983), American football running back
