= Christopher Gore (disambiguation) =

Christopher Gore (1758–1827) was a prominent Massachusetts lawyer, Federalist politician, and U.S. diplomat.

Christopher Gore may also refer to:

- Christopher Gore (writer), an American screenwriter, playwright, and lyricist
- Christopher Israel Umba Gore, an Ugandan military officer
- Chris Gore (born 1965), American film critic and writer, founder of the Film Threat magazine and website
