= Rohit Gore =

Indian IT specialist and author (born 1977)

- Born: 19 March 1977 (age 49); Pune, India
- Occupation: Writer
- Spouse: Pranita Pathak
- Children: 1
- Writing career
- Genres: Fiction, literature
- Website: www.rohitgore.com

Rohit Gore is an Indian IT specialist and author who writes novels on various genres.

== Personal life ==
Rohit Gore grew up in the towns of Mumbai and has lived in London. Gore received an MBA from S. P. Jain Institute of Management and Research.

== Career ==
Gore has been in the IT industry for more than ten years. When he was younger he wanted to be "a theatre actor, an architect and a bookshop owner."

His first book, Focus Sam, was reviewed in the Hindustan Times in May 2011. His second book, The Darker Dawn, was published in 2011. His third book, Circle of Three (13 August 2012), sold more than 10,000 copies as of July 2013. His latest release, The Guardian Angels, was published by Grapevine India on 10 July 2013.

== Works ==
- Focus Sam (2011)
- The Darker Dawn (2011)
- Circle of Three (2012)
- The Guardian Angels (2013)
