= Chelsea F.C. Women =

English women's association football club

Chelsea Women
- Full name: Chelsea Football Club Women
- Nickname: The Blues
- Founded: 1992; 34 years ago
- Ground: Stamford Bridge
- Capacity: 40,044
- Coordinates: 51°28′54″N 0°11′27″W
- Owner(s): BlueCo (92%); Seven Seven Six (8%)
- Head coach: Sonia Bompastor
- League: Women's Super League
- 2025–26: WSL, 3rd of 12
- Website: chelseafc.com
Home colours	Away colours	Third colours

Chelsea Football Club Women, formerly known as Chelsea Ladies Football Club, are an English women's football club based in Fulham, London. Founded in 1992, they compete in the Women's Super League, the top flight of women's football in England, and play their home games at Stamford Bridge. Since 2004, the club has been affiliated with Chelsea F.C., the men's team in the Premier League. Chelsea Women were a founding member of the Super League in 2010. From 2005 to 2010, the side competed in the Premier League National Division, the top tier of women's football in England at the time.

One of the most successful clubs in English women's football, Chelsea have won a record eight Women's Super League championships, as well as the FA WSL Spring Series in 2017, and have the second-highest number of outright league championships after Arsenal. They have also won six Women's FA Cup titles, four Women's League Cup titles, and were Women's FA Community Shield winners in 2020. They reached their first UEFA Women's Champions League final in 2021, where they finished as runners-up to Barcelona.

== History ==
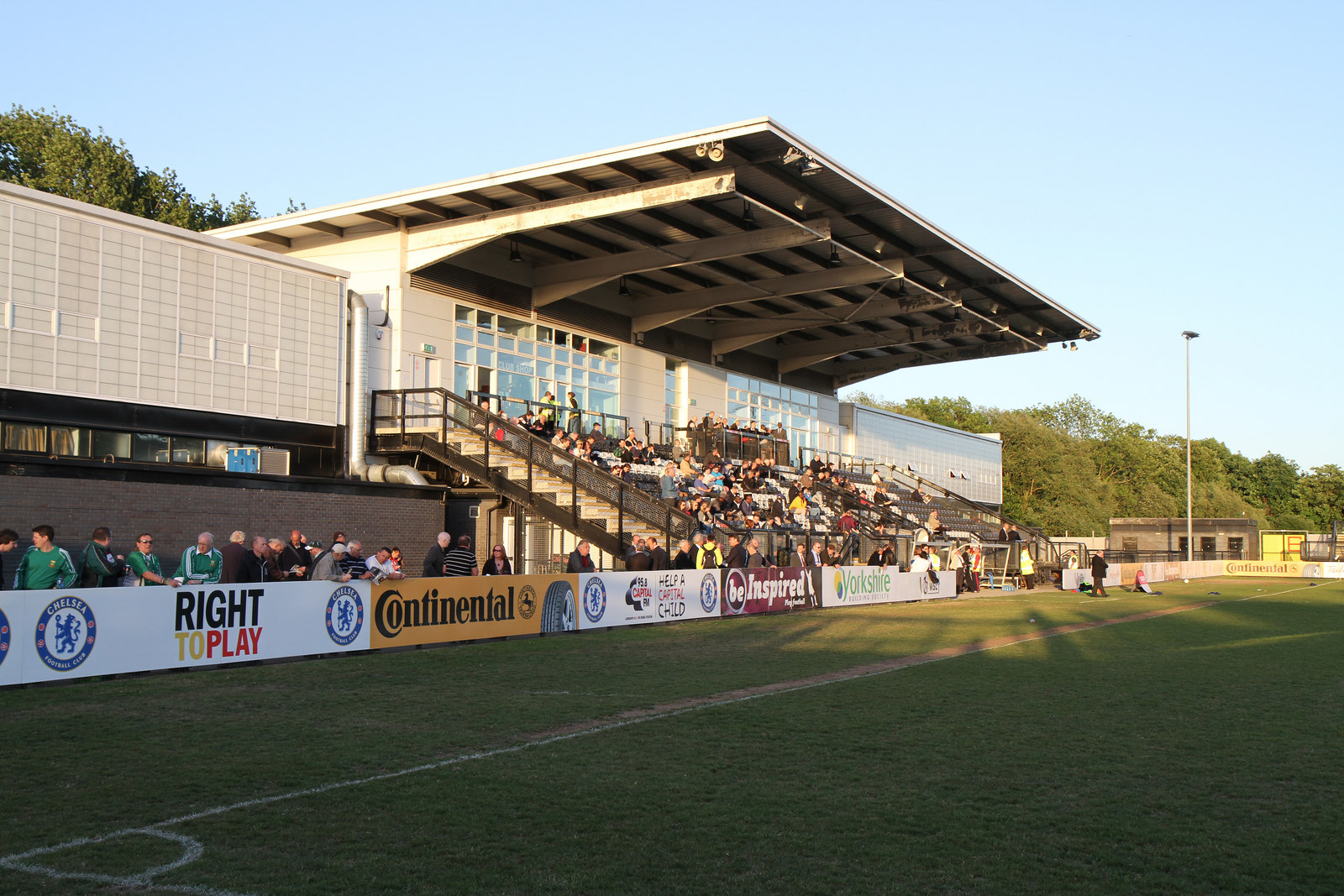
Imperial Fields, Chelsea's home ground during the inaugural 2011 WSL season

=== Earlier unofficial team ===
In the early 1970s, an unofficial Chelsea Ladies F.C. was formed soon after The Football Association had lifted its 50-year ban on women's football. Under the management of John Martin, they beat Millwall Lionesses to win the 1974 London Women's Football Challenge Cup in a season when they did a league and cup double. They repeated the feat the following season. Although more of a supporters team rather than an official representative of Chelsea F.C., the club's president at the time was John Hollins, who was a long-time Chelsea player.

=== Establishment and promotion (1992–2005) ===
Chelsea Ladies Football Club was formed in 1992 after supporters of Chelsea F.C. expressed desire for a women's side. Tony Farmer, a longtime Chelsea supporter who became interested in women's football when his girlfriend Val Lightfoot joined Crystal Palace, wrote a letter to Chelsea F.C. to propose adding a women's side.

Upon approval, Farmer became the club's first manager, lobbied for it to be promoted in men's match programmes, and began recruiting youth players to the club, including Casey Stoney and Fara Williams as 12-year-olds in 1994 and 1996, respectively. The side's first home pitch was Hurlingham Park in Fulham. Farmer managed the club from the Greater London Regional League Division 3 to the Greater London Regional Premier Division before resigning in 1997.

In June 2004, Chelsea Ladies were taken over and funded by Chelsea's Football in the Community department, and in 2004–05 Chelsea won promotion to the Premier League National Division. The club has participated at the top level ever since.

=== FA Premier League National Division (2005–2010) ===
After starting 2005–06 with one point from six games, manager George Michealas was fired in September after four years in charge. They finished bottom of the league that season under Shaun Gore, but won a promotion/relegation play-off against Northern Division runners-up Liverpool 4–1 on aggregate to stay in the Premier League National Division. During the season the club had been linked with a transfer bid for North American star players Tiffeny Milbrett and Christine Sinclair.

After an eighth-place finish in 2006–07, Gore drafted in England players Siobhan Chamberlain, Casey Stoney and Eniola Aluko that summer. American World Cup winner Lorrie Fair, regarded as one of the best midfielders in the women's game, joined in January as Chelsea finished 2007–08 in fifth position.

Chelsea Ladies introduced a new manager for the 2008–09 season, former Arsenal Ladies reserve team coach Steve Jones. On 2 July 2008 Chelsea surprisingly signed Lianne Sanderson and Anita Asante from Arsenal Ladies, in addition to veteran Mary Phillip. Then Arsenal Ladies manager Vic Akers criticised his former players as disrespectful, while pursuing players from other clubs to bolster his own squad.

Chelsea Ladies finished the 2008–09 season third behind Arsenal and Everton. Mary Phillip retired a month into the new season, Aluko and Asante left for the new WPS in March 2009, while Fair missed the whole campaign with a cruciate ligament injury sustained in May 2008. Jones departed as manager in January 2009, leaving Stoney to act as player/manager.

At Stoney's recommendation, Matt Beard became manager for the 2009–10 season. Cuts to the Ladies club's funding were offset by financial assistance from John Terry and other Chelsea F.C. players. A further blow arrived when Sanderson left for the 2010 WPS season.

=== Women's Super League (2011–present) ===
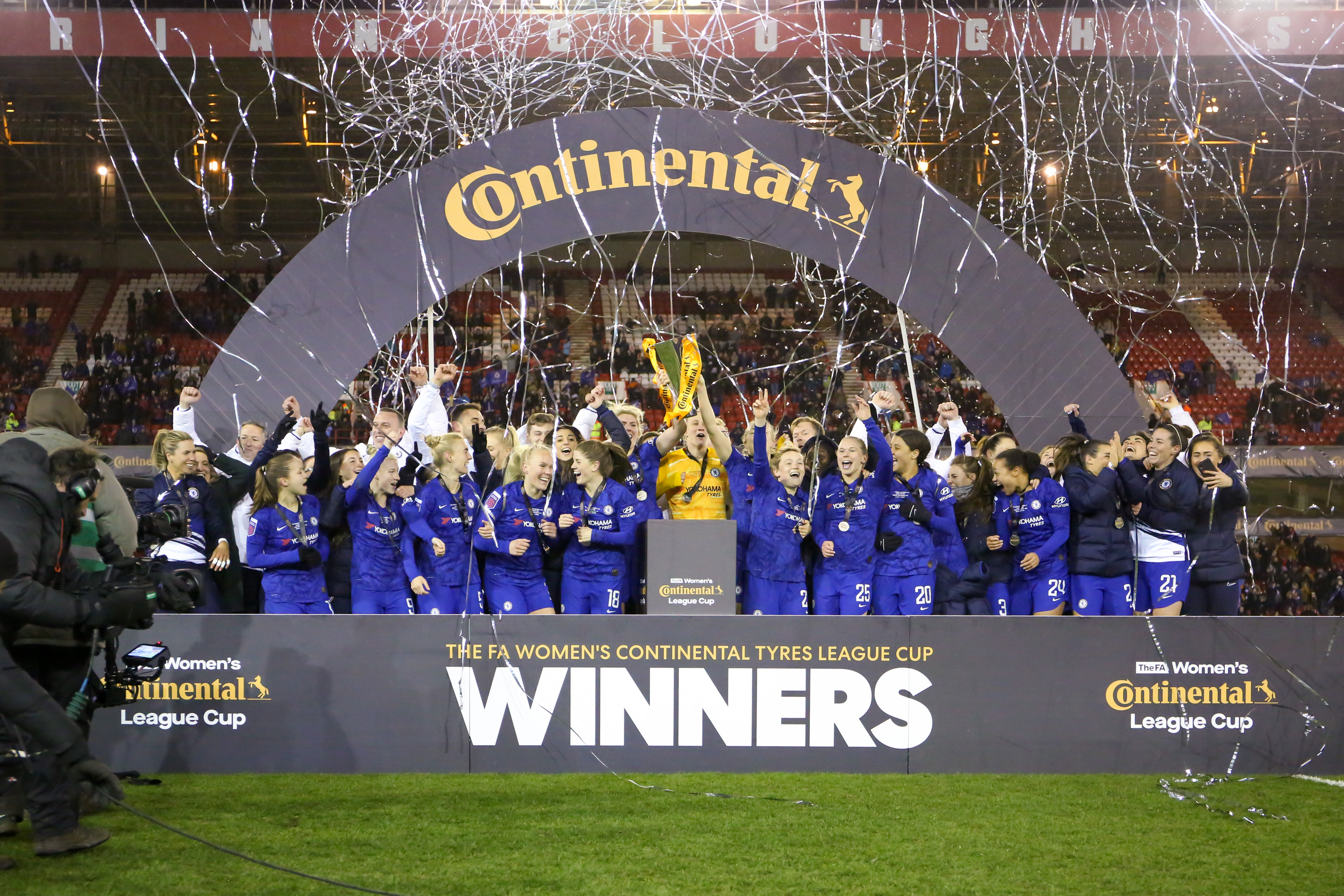
Chelsea players celebrating their first FA Women's League Cup win in 2020

The club bid successfully to be one of eight founding teams in the FA Women's Super League (WSL) in March 2011. On 13 April 2011, the first-ever WSL fixture was played — at Imperial Fields, Chelsea's home ground — between them and Arsenal, which they lost 1–0. Beard led the club to the Women's FA Cup final for the first time in 2012, but Chelsea were eventually beaten by Birmingham City on a penalty shootout after twice taking the lead in a 2–2 draw.

In July 2012, Matt Beard resigned as manager after three years in the post. Former assistant at Arsenal, Emma Hayes, was brought in as manager in 2012, one of the first female managers in the WSL. In Hayes's first season in charge, Chelsea, who were still a part-time professional club, finished third-bottom of the league. The following season, they finished second from the bottom.

The 2014 season was successful for Chelsea, as they finished second in the WSL behind Liverpool on goal difference, after eight wins, two draws and four losses. A final day win would have clinched them the league title, but they lost 2–1 away to Manchester City. Their second-place finish meant that they qualified for the UEFA Women's Champions League for the first time in the club's history. They also reached the semi-finals of both the FA Cup and the League Cup, where they lost to both eventual winners, Arsenal and Manchester City, respectively.

In 2015, it was announced that many of Chelsea's players would be becoming full professionals for the first time. On 1 August 2015, Chelsea won their first ever Women's FA Cup. They beat Notts County Ladies at Wembley Stadium. Ji So-yun scored the only goal of the game and Eniola Aluko won the player of the match award. The team then beat Sunderland 4–0 in October 2015 to secure the FA WSL title and a League and Cup double. Chelsea repeated that feat in the 2017–18 season, winning another FA WSL and Women's FA Cup double; in the same season, the team also reached the semi-finals of the UEFA Women's Champions League for the first time. On 23 May 2018, the club rebranded as Chelsea Football Club Women.

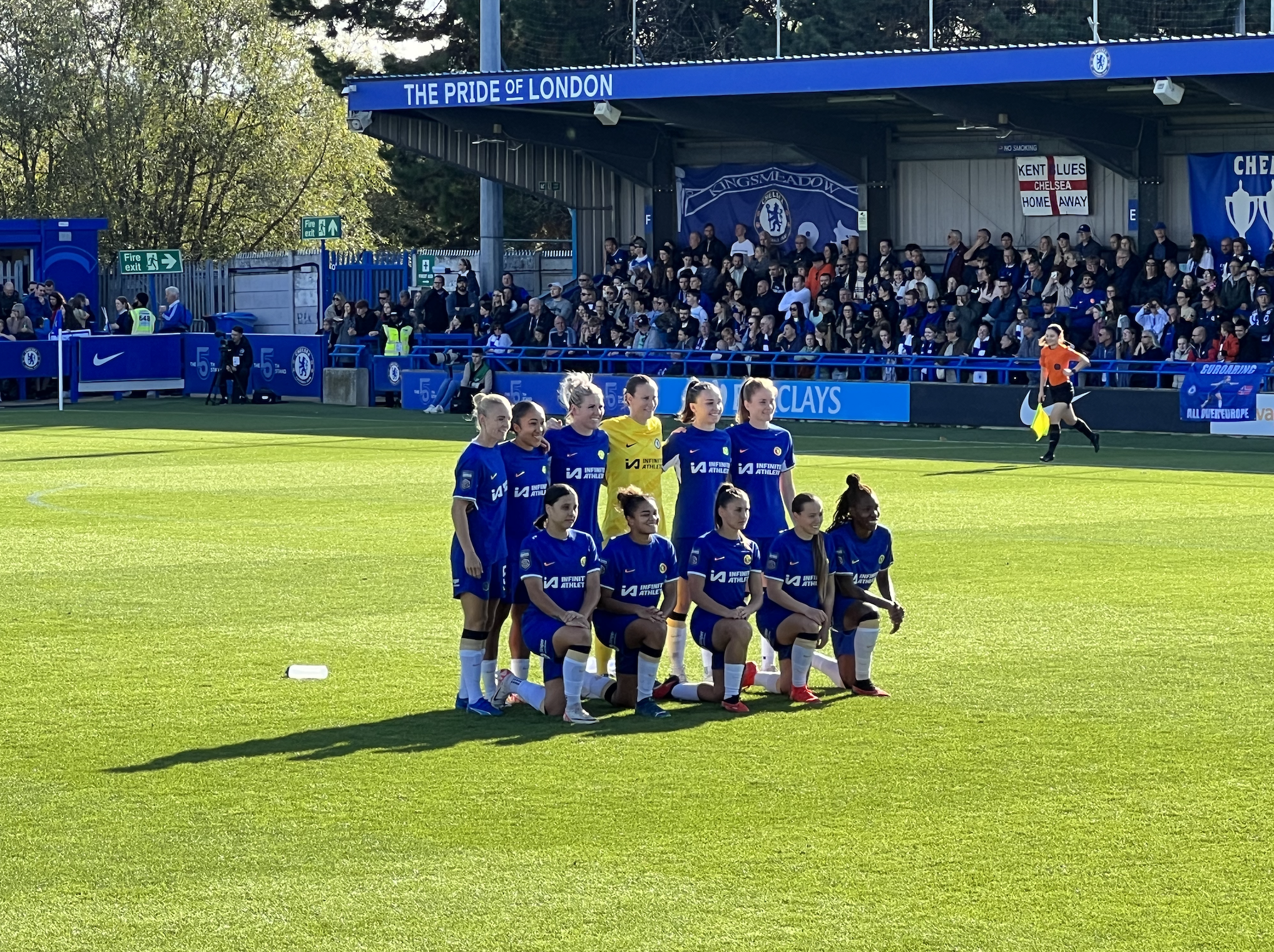
Chelsea's squad ahead of a game against Brighton in 2023

Chelsea were awarded the 2019–20 WSL title on a points-per-game basis after the season had to be abruptly terminated due to the COVID-19 pandemic. The club was unbeaten at the time.

Chelsea began the 2020–21 season by winning their first ever FA Community Shield, against Manchester City. The season also saw them win their second consecutive League Cup, winning 6–0 against Bristol City. Chelsea and manager Hayes won their fourth WSL title, the most by any WSL team at the time, by two points on the final day of the 2020–21 FA WSL season with a 5–0 victory over Reading. Chelsea broke the record for most points in a season (57) and tied the record for most wins in a season (18). In addition, they became just the third team to defend the League title after Liverpool and Arsenal. Sam Kerr won the WSL Golden Boot for most goals scored by an individual (21), while Fran Kirby was joint top for assists (11) and goalkeeper Ann-Katrin Berger registered the most clean sheets (12), winning the Golden Glove. Given their remarkable performances over the season, Suzanne Wrack of The Guardian stated that Chelsea was "one of the best women's teams to ever play in England's top flight". On 16 May 2021, Chelsea, on course for a quadruple, lost 4–0 to Barcelona in their first-ever Champions League final appearance. On 5 December 2021, Chelsea won the delayed 2020–21 FA Cup, beating the league leaders Arsenal 3–0 in a dominant display with goals from Kirby and two from Kerr, winning their first domestic treble.

Chelsea successfully retained the WSL title during the 2021–22, 2022–23 (with both seasons also retaining the FA Cup) as well as the 2023–24 seasons, the latter of which was the club's last season under manager Emma Hayes as she left the club at the end of the season to become the manager of the United States women's national team. She was replaced by Sonia Bompastor from the 2024–25 season, who was previously at Lyon. In her first season, Bompastor led Chelsea to a domestic treble as the club remained unbeaten in all three domestic competitions, and finished the WSL season with a record-breaking 60 points for a sixth consecutive title.

== Ownership ==
In May 2025, technology entrepreneur Alexis Ohanian acquired a 10% minority stake in Chelsea Women for approximately £20 million, valuing the club at around £200 million. Ohanian was also reported to be taking a seat on the club's board of directors.

== Stadium ==
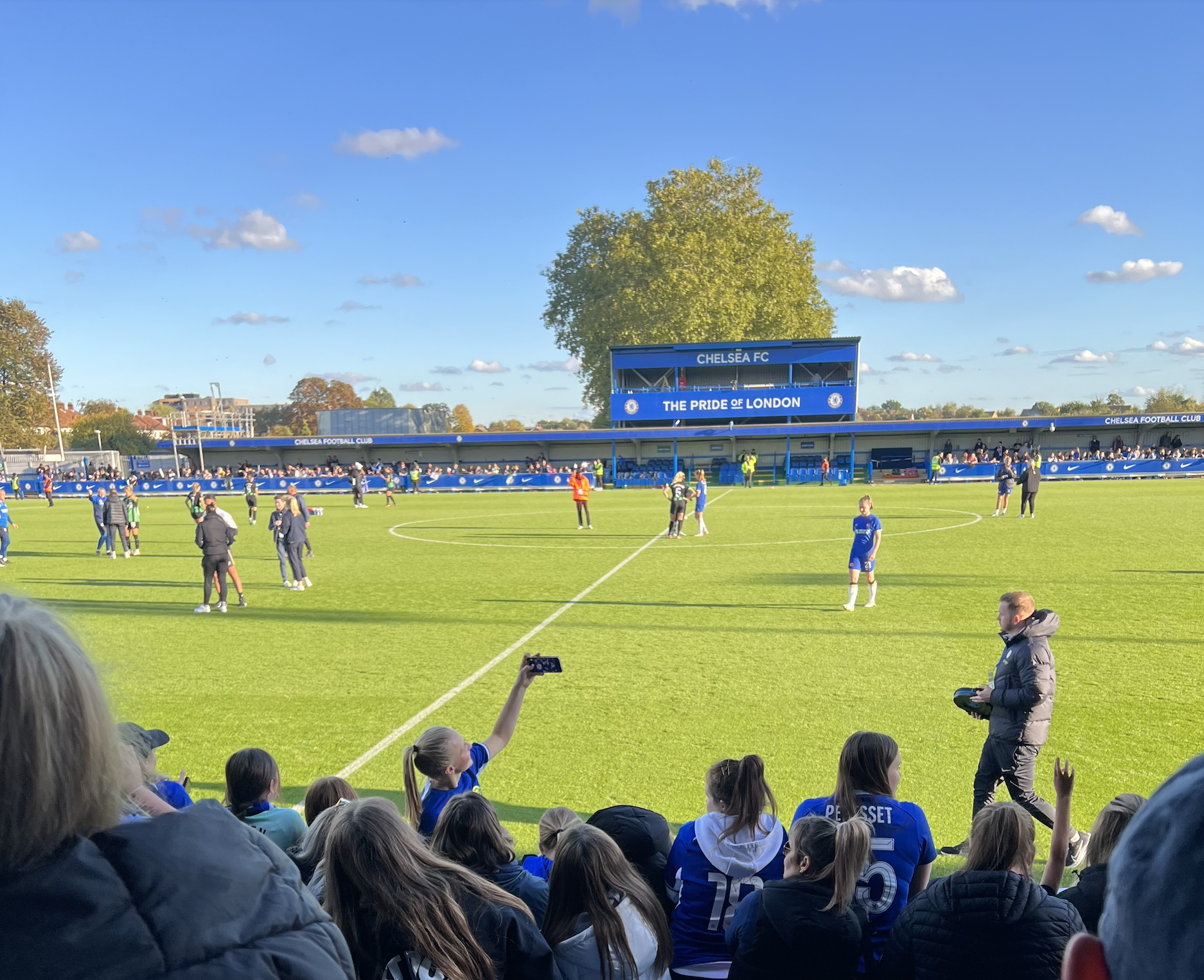
Kingsmeadow in 2023

Chelsea Women play at Stamford Bridge in Fulham, London. The club played its first match at Stamford Bridge in 2016 against VfL Wolfsburg in the 2016–17 UEFA Women's Champions League. Since the early 2020s, the venue has been increasingly used for high-profile matches in both domestic and European competitions. In the 2023–24 season, Chelsea Women played a record four Women's Super League matches at the stadium, followed by three matches in the 2024–25 season. Ahead of the 2026–27 season, all home matches of the Women's Super League were moved to Stamford Bridge, while domestic cup matches and UEFA Women's Champions League league phase matches were moved to Plough Lane.

Previously, Chelsea Women played at Kingsmeadow in Norbiton, Kingston upon Thames, London. Chelsea F.C. bought Kingsmeadow for their youth and women's teams from AFC Wimbledon in 2016 so that Wimbledon could fund their new ground, Plough Lane. Kingsmeadow has a capacity of 4,850, including 2,265 seats. Between 2012 and 2017, Chelsea Women played their home games at Wheatsheaf Park. The stadium is located in Staines-upon-Thames and has a capacity for 3,002 spectators. In the inaugural WSL season in 2011, the team played at Imperial Fields, the home ground of Tooting & Mitcham United.

=== Attendance ===
The current home attendance record of a Chelsea Women's match is 39,398, set on 27 April 2024 during the 2023–24 UEFA Women's Champions League semi-final second leg against Barcelona, played at Stamford Bridge. Their home attendance record at Kingsmeadow is 4,670, set on 28 April 2019 in a Champion's League semi-final leg against Lyon.

== Players ==
=== Current squad ===
As of 20 October 2026

Note: Flags indicate national team as defined under FIFA eligibility rules; some limited exceptions apply. Players may hold more than one non-FIFA nationality.

No.	Pos.	Nation	Player
1	GK	SUI	Livia Peng
2	DF	AUS	Ellie Carpenter
4	DF	USA	Naomi Girma
5	DF	NED	Veerle Buurman
6	MF	GER	Sjoeke Nüsken
7	FW	COL	Mayra Ramírez
8	MF	SCO	Erin Cuthbert (captain)
9	FW	FRA	Melvine Malard
10	FW	ENG	Lauren James
11	FW	FRA	Sandy Baltimore
12	FW	USA	Alyssa Thompson
14	DF	SWE	Nathalie Björn (vice-captain)
15	DF	IRL	Katie McCabe
16	MF	ITA	Giulia Dragoni

No.	Pos.	Nation	Player
17	DF	ENG	Nelly Las
19	MF	NED	Wieke Kaptein
21	MF	ENG	Keira Walsh
22	DF	ENG	Lucy Bronze (vice-captain)
23	FW	JPN	Maika Hamano
24	GK	ENG	Hannah Hampton
25	MF	ENG	Lola Brown
26	DF	CAN	Kadeisha Buchanan
29	MF	JPN	Manaka Matsukubo
31	FW	FRA	Rachael Adedini
32	MF	ENG	Lexi Potter
33	FW	ENG	Aggie Beever-Jones
38	GK	JAM	Becky Spencer
42	DF	ENG	Chloe Sarwie

=== Out on loan ===
Note: Flags indicate national team as defined under FIFA eligibility rules; some limited exceptions apply. Players may hold more than one non-FIFA nationality.

No.	Pos.	Nation	Player
27	FW	GER	Mara Alber (at VfL Wolfsburg until 30 June 2027)
28	GK	NED	Femke Liefting (at Ajax until 30 June 2027)
34	MF	ENG	Vera Jones (at Watford until 30 June 2027)
40	GK	ENG	Katie Cox (at Nottingham Forest until 30 June 2027)

No.	Pos.	Nation	Player
—	MF	ENG	Eva Hendle (at Rangers until 30 June 2027)
—	FW	FRA	Louna Ribadeira (at Fleury 91 until 30 June 2027)
—	FW	ENG	Lois Shooter (at Nottingham Forest until 30 June 2027)

=== Former players ===
For details of former players, see Category:Chelsea F.C. Women players.

=== Player of the Season ===
Year	Player	Position	Ref.
2015	(England) Eniola Aluko	Forward	
2016	(England) Katie Chapman	Midfielder	
2017	(England) Karen Carney	Midfielder	
2017–18	(England) Fran Kirby	Forward	
2018–19	(Scotland) Erin Cuthbert	Midfielder	
2019–20	Bethany England	Forward	
2020–21	(England) Fran Kirby	Forward	
2021–22	(Australia) Sam Kerr	Forward	
2022–23	(Australia) Sam Kerr	Forward	
2023–24	(England) Lauren James	Forward	
2024–25	(Scotland) Erin Cuthbert	Midfielder	
2025–26	(England) Lauren James	Forward	

== Management team ==
Position	Name
Head coach	(France) Sonia Bompastor
Assistant coaches	(France) Camille Abily
Assistant coaches	(France) Théo Rivrin
Goalkeeping coach	(England) Chris Williams
Assistant goalkeeping coach	(England) Dan Smith
Opposition analyst	(England) Jack Stephens
Lead scout	(England) TJ O'Leary

Source: Chelsea F.C.

=== Managerial history ===
Name	Years	Ref.
(England) Tony Farmer	1992–1997	
(England) Steve Leacock	1997–2001	
(England) George Michaelas	2001–2005	
(England) Shaun Gore	2005–2008	
(England) Steve Jones	2008–2009	
(England) Matt Beard	2009–2012	
(England) Emma Hayes	2012–2024	
(France) Sonia Bompastor	2024–present	

== Honours ==
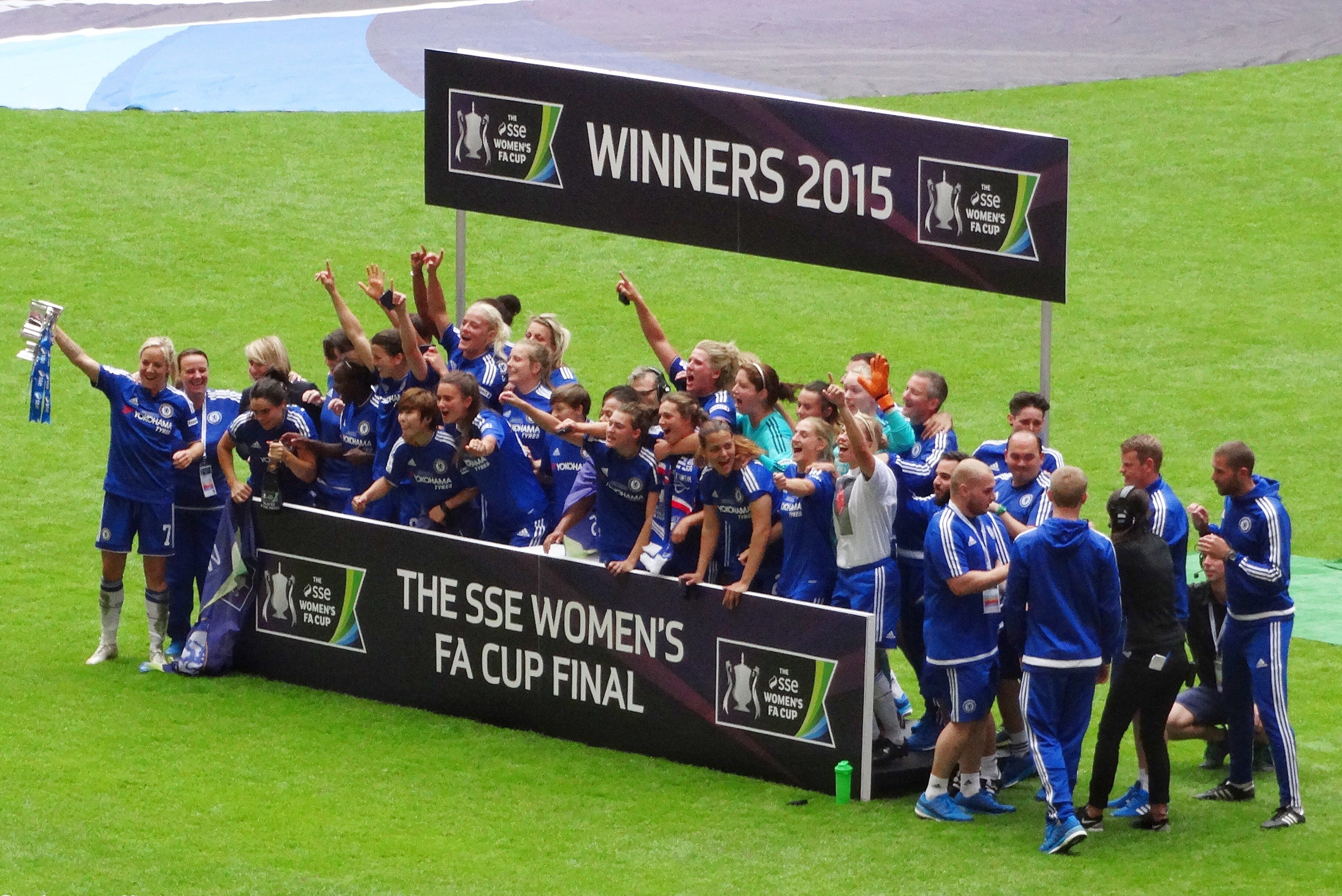
Chelsea players celebrating winning the 2014–15 FA Women's Cup.

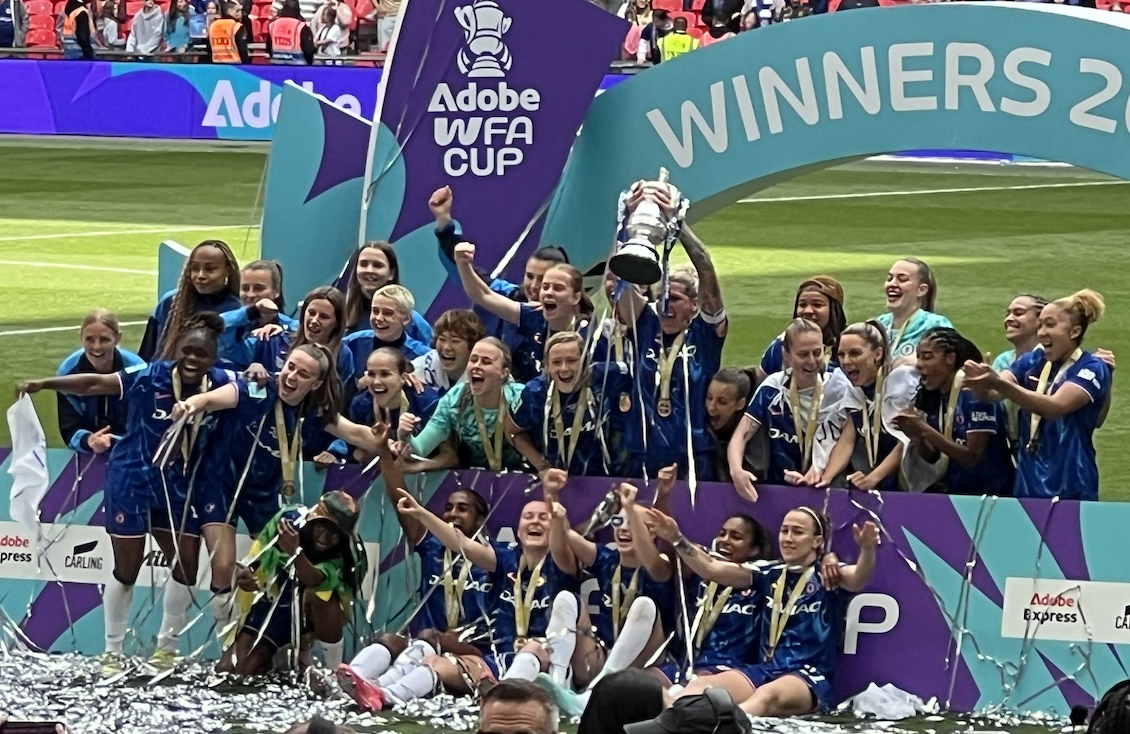
Chelsea hoisting their sixth FA Cup trophy in 2025.

Chelsea's first trophy was won during the 1998–99 season, when the team defeated Reading Royals 2–1 in the Berks & Bucks County Cup final. The club's first major trophy was the Women's FA Cup, won in 2015. In the same year, the club also won its first FA Women's Super League (FA WSL) title. After winning the 2021–22 FA WSL, Chelsea became the first team to win the WSL title for three seasons in a row. The club's most recent trophy is a fourth Women's League Cup title, won in 2025–26.

Chelsea Women honours
Type	Competition	Titles	Years
Domestic league	Women's Super League	8	2015, 2017–18, 2019–20, 2020–21, 2021–22, 2022–23, 2023–24, 2024–25
Domestic league	FA WSL Spring Series	1	2017
Domestic league	Premier League Southern Division (second tier)	1	2004–05
Domestic league	South East Combination League (third tier)	1	1999–2000
Domestic league	Greater London Regional League – Division 3	1	1993–94
Domestic cup	Women's FA Cup	6	2014–15, 2017–18, 2020–21, 2021–22, 2022–23, 2024–25
Domestic cup	Women's League Cup	4	2019–20, 2020–21, 2024–25, 2025–26
Domestic cup	Women's FA Community Shield	1	2020
Minor competitions	South East Combination League Cup	1	1999–2000
Minor competitions	Berks & Bucks County Cup	3	1998–99, 1999–2000, 2000–01
Minor competitions	Surrey County Cup	9	2002–03, 2003–04, 2005–06, 2006–07, 2007–08, 2008–09, 2009–10, 2011–12, 2012–13
Minor competitions	World Sevens Football	1	2026

- record

Doubles

- 2014−15: League and FA Cup
- 2017–18: League and FA Cup
- 2019–20: League and League Cup
- 2021–22: League and FA Cup
- 2022–23: League and FA Cup

Trebles

- 2020–21: League, FA Cup and League Cup
- 2024–25: League, FA Cup and League Cup

== Season-by-season records ==
=== Record in UEFA Women's Champions League ===
All results (home, away and aggregate) list Chelsea's goal tally first.

Season	Round	Opponents	Home	Away	Aggregate
2015–16	Round of 32	(Scotland) Glasgow City	1–0	3–0	4–0
2015–16	Round of 16	(Germany) VfL Wolfsburg	1–2	0–2	1–4
2016–17	Round of 32	(Germany) VfL Wolfsburg	0–3	1–1	1–4
2017–18	Round of 32	(Germany) Bayern Munich	1–0	1–2	2–2 (a)
2017–18	Round of 16	(Sweden) Rosengård	3–0	1–0	4–0
2017–18	Quarter-final	(France) Montpellier	3–1	2–0	5–1
2017–18	Semi-final	(Germany) VfL Wolfsburg	1–3	0–2	1–5
2018–19	Round of 32	(Bosnia and Herzegovina) SFK 2000	6–0	5–0	11–0
2018–19	Round of 16	(Italy) Fiorentina	1–0	6–0	7–0
2018–19	Quarter-final	(France) Paris Saint-Germain	2–0	1–2	3–2
2018–19	Semi-final	(France) Lyon	1–1	1–2	2–3
2020–21	Round of 32	(Portugal) Benfica	3–0	5–0	8–0
2020–21	Round of 16	(Spain) Atlético Madrid	2–0	1–1	3–1
2020–21	Quarter-final	(Germany) VfL Wolfsburg	2–1	3–0	5–1
2020–21	Semi-final	(Germany) Bayern Munich	4–1	1–2	5–3
2020–21	Final	(Spain) Barcelona	0–4		
2021–22	Group stage	(Germany) VfL Wolfsburg	3–3	0–4	3rd place (Group A)
2021–22	Group stage	(Italy) Juventus	0–0	2–1	3rd place (Group A)
2021–22	Group stage	(Switzerland) Servette	1–0	7–0	3rd place (Group A)
2022–23	Group stage	(France) Paris Saint-Germain	3–0	1–0	1st place (Group A)
2022–23	Group stage	(Albania) Vllaznia	8–0	4–0	1st place (Group A)
2022–23	Group stage	(Spain) Real Madrid	2–0	1–1	1st place (Group A)
2022–23	Quarter-final	(France) Lyon	1–2	1–0	2–2 (4–3 p)
2022–23	Semi-final	(Spain) Barcelona	0–1	1–1	1–2
2023–24	Group stage	(Spain) Real Madrid	2–1	2–2	1st place (Group D)
2023–24	Group stage	(France) Paris FC	4–1	4–0	1st place (Group D)
2023–24	Group stage	(Sweden) BK Häcken	0–0	3–1	1st place (Group D)
2023–24	Quarter-final	(Netherlands) Ajax	1–1	3–0	4–1
2023–24	Semi-final	(Spain) Barcelona	0–2	1–0	1–2
2024–25	Group stage	(Spain) Real Madrid	3–2	2–1	1st place (Group B)
2024–25	Group stage	(Netherlands) Twente	6–1	3–1	1st place (Group B)
2024–25	Group stage	(Scotland) Celtic	3–0	2–1	1st place (Group B)
2024–25	Quarter-final	(England) Manchester City	3–0	0–2	3–2
2024–25	Semi-final	(Spain) Barcelona	1–4	1–4	2–8
2025–26	League phase	(Netherlands) Twente	—N/a	1–1	3rd of 18
2025–26	League phase	(France) Paris FC	4–0	—N/a	3rd of 18
2025–26	League phase	(Austria) St. Pölten	—N/a	6–0	3rd of 18
2025–26	League phase	(Spain) Barcelona	1–1	—N/a	3rd of 18
2025–26	League phase	(Italy) Roma	6–0	—N/a	3rd of 18
2025–26	League phase	(Germany) VfL Wolfsburg	—N/a	2–1	3rd of 18
2025–26	Quarter-final	(England) Arsenal	1–0	1–3	2–3
2026–27	Third qualifying round	(Spain) Real Sociedad	5–2	1–0	6–2
2026–27	League phase	Austria Wien	1–0	—N/a	
2026–27	League phase	(France) OL Lyonnes	—N/a	0–0	
2026–27	League phase	(Italy) Roma	2–0	—N/a	
2026–27	League phase	(Sweden) BK Häcken	—N/a	0–0	
2026–27	League phase	(France) Paris Saint-Germain	1–0	—N/a	
2026–27	League phase	(Belgium) OH Leuven	—N/a		

Colour key: Green = Chelsea win; Yellow = draw; Red = opponents win.

== UEFA club coefficient ranking ==
Rank	Team	Points
1	(Spain) Barcelona	135.000
2	(France) OL Lyonnes	116.750
3	(England) Chelsea	95.500
4	(Germany) Bayern Munich	81.250
5	(England) Arsenal	78.000

As of 3 July 2026
