= Sir Paul Gore, 1st Baronet =

Anglo-Irish politician

Sir Paul Gore, 1st Baronet (1567 – September 1629) was an Anglo-Irish politician, soldier and baronet.

Born in London, he was the youngest son of Gerard Gore and his wife Helen Davenant, daughter of Ralph Davenant. Gore had come to Ireland as a commander of a troop of horse and, in 1602, he was despatched to accompany the 1st Earl of Tyrconnell to a meeting with Queen Elizabeth I of England. He sat as Member of Parliament (MP) in the Irish House of Commons for Ballyshannon from 1613 until 1615. On 2 February 1622, he was created a baronet, of Magherabegg, in the County Donegal.

He married Isabella Wycliffe, daughter of Francis Wycliffe and niece of the 1st Earl of Strafford. They had thirteen children, seven daughters and six sons. Gore was buried at the Abbey Church of Donegal. His eldest son Ralph succeeded to the baronetcy and was an ancestor of the Earl of Ross. His son Arthur was himself created a baronet and was an ancestor of the Irish creation of the Earls of Arran, the Barons Harlech as well as the Irish Barons Annaly. His fourth son Francis was the progenitor of the Gore-Booth Baronets.

Baronetage of Ireland
New creation	Baronet (of Magherabegg); 1622–1629	Succeeded by Ralph Gore
