= Sir William Gore, 3rd Baronet =

Anglo-Irish baronet (died 1700)

Sir William Gore, 3rd Baronet PC (Ire) (died 1700) was an Anglo-Irish baronet and magistrate.

He was the oldest son of Sir Ralph Gore, 2nd Baronet and his wife Anne Caulfeild, second daughter of William Caulfeild, 2nd Baron Caulfeild. In 1661, he succeeded his father as baronet. Gore was appointed Custos Rotulorum of Leitrim in 1684, an office he held until his death in 1700. He was sworn off the Privy Council of Ireland.

He married Hannah Hamilton, daughter of James Hamilton and niece of Gustavus Hamilton, 1st Viscount Boyne, and had by her three sons and five daughters. Gore died in 1700 and was succeeded in the baronetcy by his oldest son Ralph.

Political offices
Preceded by ?	Custos Rotulorum of Leitrim; 1684–1700	Succeeded by ?
Baronetage of Ireland
Preceded by Ralph Gore	Baronet (of Magherabegg); 1661–1700	Succeeded by Ralph Gore
