= David Gore (disambiguation) =

David Gore may refer to:

- David Gore (1827–1911), American politician and farmer
- David Alan Gore (1953–2012), American serial killer
- David Gore-Booth (1943–2004), British diplomat
- David Ormsby-Gore, 5th Baron Harlech (1918–1985), British diplomat and politician
