= Deelfontein =

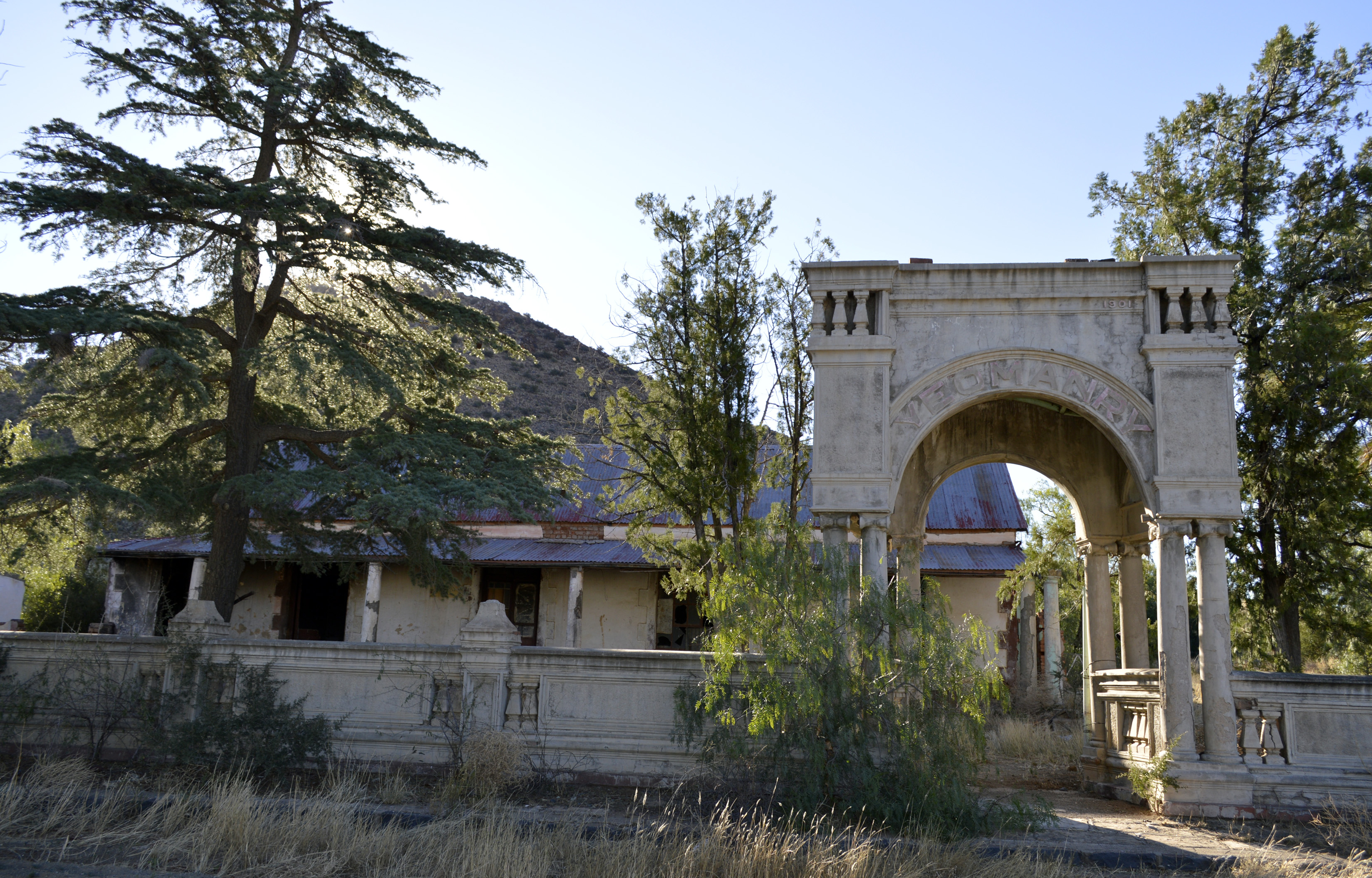
- Deelfontein

- Location within Northern Cape Location within South Africa
- Coordinates: 30.992°S 23.798°E
- Country: South Africa
- Province: Northern Cape
- District: Pixley ka Seme
- Municipality: Emthanjeni
- Time zone: UTC+2 (SAST)

Deelfontein is a village in the Great Karoo, Northern Cape, region of South Africa on the route of the Pretoria to Cape Town railway. It primarily developed to service the railway due to its good water supply for steam locomotives, and is currently the location of a passing loop on the single-track line.

In 1900 a British military field hospital, the Imperial Yeomanry Hospital, was constructed for casualties from the Second Boer War. The location was chosen for its communications and dry climate, and its proximity to De Aar, then the centre of hostilities. Alfred Downing Fripp was Chief Medical Officer.

The hospital was unusual in pioneering the use of x-ray diagnosis. The surgeon-radiographer in charge, Major John Hall-Edwards, achieved eminence in this field, though he subsequently lost an arm through x-ray damage.

The hospital, with a capacity for some 800 patients, largely comprised tents and prefabricated huts; at the cease of hostilities, materials from the latter were used for housing at Red Location, a township for Africans outside Port Elizabeth.

Little remains of the complex except a cemetery with around 130 graves and the remains of the Yeomanry Hotel, built after the war to accommodate soldiers' relatives visiting the site.

In 2005 a train collision occurred in Deelfontein as a result of solder splatter bridging a relay contact and causing a wrong-side signal failure.
