= John Gore (MP for Malmesbury) =

English politician (fl. 1414–1432)

John Gore (fl. 1414–1432) was an English politician. He sat as MP for Malmesbury in November 1414, March 1416, December 1421 and 1431. He also served as tax collector of Wiltshire in September 1432.
