= Shaun Gore =

English footballer and coach

Personal information
- Full name: Shaun Michael Gore
- Date of birth: 21 September 1968 (age 58)
- Place of birth: West Ham, England
- Position: Centre back

Youth career
- 1985–1986: Fulham

Senior career*
Years	Team	Apps	(Gls)
1985–1991	Fulham	26	(0)
1990–1991	→ Halifax Town (loan)	15	(0)
- Wealdstone
- Fisher Athletic
- Billericay Town

Managerial career
- 2005–2008: Chelsea Ladies
- * Club domestic league appearances and goals

Shaun Gore (born 21 September 1968) is an English former professional footballer and coach.

After injury ended a promising playing career with Fulham, he became Chelsea FC's Football in the Community director in 1992. In 2005, he sacked Chelsea Ladies' manager George Michaelas and ran the team himself until being replaced by Steve Jones in 2008.
