= Charles Gore (cricketer) =

New Zealand cricketer

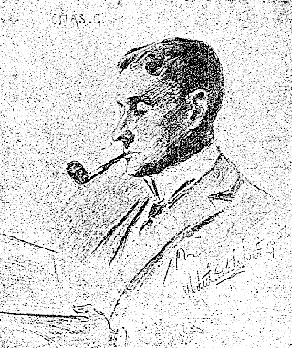
- Newspaper portrait of Gore in 1913

Personal information
- Full name: Charles St George Gore
- Born: 1 October 1871; Wellington, New Zealand
- Died: 11 December 1913 (aged 42); Wellington, New Zealand
- Batting: Right-handed
- Relatives: Arthur Gore (brother); Ross Gore (brother)

Domestic team information
- Years: Team
- 1891/92–1903/04: Wellington

Career statistics
Competition	First-class
Matches	25
Runs scored	677
Batting average	16.92
100s/50s	0/2
Top score	57
Catches/stumpings	12/–
- Source: Cricinfo, 2 April 2017

Charles St George Gore (1 October 1871 – 11 December 1913) was a New Zealand cricketer who played first-class cricket for Wellington from 1891 to 1904.

== Life and career ==
Charles Gore was one of eight children – four sons and four daughters – of Richard Benjamin Gore, who was curator of the Colonial Museum in Wellington, Government Meteorological Observer and Statistician, and Secretary to the Geological Survey Department, the New Zealand Institute and the Wellington Philosophical Society. His brothers Arthur and Ross were, like him, first-class cricketers. All four brothers were prominent tennis players in New Zealand.

A free-scoring batsman who sometimes opened the innings, and a fine fieldsman, Charles Gore played in the New Zealand cricket team's first first-class match, against the touring New South Wales team in 1893–94. He made his highest score of 57 when he and Arnold Williams added 137 for the fourth wicket for Wellington against Canterbury in 1896–97.

A popular member of sporting and social circles in Wellington, he worked in the Crown Lands Office. He died of pneumonia at the age of 42.
