= George Gore (electrochemist) =

English electrochemist

George Gore (22 January 1826 – 20 December 1908) was an English electrochemist. The invention of the safety match has been attributed to his research with phosphorus.

== Life ==
Born at Blackfriars, Bristol on 22 January 1826, he was son of George Gore, a cooper in the city. He was educated at a small private school, and at twelve became an errand boy. At 17 he was apprenticed to a cooper, following the trade for four years.

In 1851 Gore moved to Birmingham, working first as timekeeper at the Soho Foundry, and then as a practitioner in medical galvanism, He subsequently became a chemist to a phosphorus factory; from 1870 to 1880, was lecturer in physics and chemistry at King Edward's School, Birmingham; and finally, from 1880 onwards, was head of the Institute of Scientific Research, Easy Row, Birmingham, which he ran, and where he resided for the remainder of his life.

In 1865 Gore was elected Fellow of the Royal Society as the discoverer of the amorphous allotrope of antimony and electrolytic sounds, and for researches in electro-chemistry. In Birmingham, manufacturers used new methods which he suggested for electroplating. The University of Edinburgh made him hon. LL.D. in 1877, and in 1891 he was allotted a civil list pension.

Gore died at Birmingham on 20 December 1908, and was buried there at Warstone Lane cemetery.

== Works ==
Between 1853 and 1865 Gore published in the Philosophical Magazine, Pharmaceutical Journal, Journal of the Chemical Society, and elsewhere 30 research papers in chemistry and electro-metallurgy. Three dealing with the properties of electro-deposited antimony were published in the Philosophical Transactions of the Royal Society. Other major research related to the properties of liquid carbonic acid and hydrofluoric acid.

Gore was author of three technical treatises:

- The Art of Electro-metallurgy (1877; 5th edit. 1891);
- The Art of Scientific Discovery (1878);
- The Electro-lytic Separation and Refining of Metals (1890).

He wrote also The Scientific Basis of National Progress (1882) and The Scientific Basis of Morality (1899), based on strong materialistic views.

== Family ==
George married in 1849 Hannah, daughter of Thomas Owen, a Baptist minister; they had issue one son and one daughter. His wife predeceased him in 1907. By his will he directed that his residuary estate, about £5000 should be divided equally between the Royal Society of London and the Royal Institution of Great Britain, to be applied in "assisting original scientific discovery". His daughter, Alice Augusta Gore Fysh, was granted in 1911 a civil list pension of £50.

== Notes ==
Attribution

This article incorporates text from a publication now in the public domain: Lee, Sidney, ed. (1912). "Gore, George". Dictionary of National Biography (2nd supplement). Vol. 2. London: Smith, Elder & Co.
