= Bobby Gore =

American street gang leader and activist (1936-2013)

- Gore during a press conference in Chicago, 1968
- Born: Frederick Douglas Gore; May 11, 1936; Chicago, Illinois, U.S.
- Died: February 12, 2013 (aged 76); Chicago Heights, Illinois, U.S.
- Education: Northern Illinois University
- Occupations: Street gang leader, activist
- Years active: 1958–2013
- Criminal charges: Murder – 1969
- Criminal penalty: 10–year sentence
- Criminal status: Released in 1979
- Spouses: Etheal Thomas (m. 1991–2013): Rose Hunt
- Children: 4

Bobby Gore (born Frederick Douglas Gore; May 11, 1936 – February 12, 2013) was an American gang leader and activist from Chicago, Illinois. Gore was the former leader of the "Conservative Vice Lords" (CVL),

== Early life ==
Gore was born in Cook County Hospital in Chicago to Frederick Gore, who worked at the Chicago stockyards 30 years, and his wife Susie Gore, a homemaker and housewife. Gore had two sisters, Josephine, and Jesse Mae Gore, both now deceased. Bobby and his sister grew up in a racially changing neighborhood by Damen Ave. and Fillmore St. Despite having polio, he played sports and grew up like the other kids in the neighborhood. Gore wound up dropping out of Cregier Vocational High School in his senior year, 1953, to help his parents financially. Bobby then joined the Clovers, since they were hanging out in his Lawndale neighborhood. The Clovers were basically a social athletic club and Bobby joined the baseball team.

== Conservative Vice Lords (CVL) ==
By 1958, the Conservative Vice Lords (CVL) were formed by Edwin Marlon "Pepalo" Perry, and six others who were in the St. Charles, Illinois Youth Center; at this time Gore joined them, leaving The Clovers. The CVL would eventually have 26 branches and 10,000 members. Around the same time, Gore alternated jobs at Swift & Company and Advanced Finishing Company from 1953 until he began work for CVL, Inc. in 1967. The West Side of Chicago, Illinois neighborhood of North Lawndale, where the Vice Lords are from, was considered one of the most dangerous ghettos in the country at the time. Gore came from a complex background, being involved in the Vice Lords and living in a crime-ridden neighborhood, but dreamed of a community that was more involved where the youth had a better chance at success, and sought to turn the Vice Lords into a positive organization. During Gore's tenure, the Vice Lords attempted to change their focus. They renamed the organization "Conservative Vice Lords" (CVL) and received acclaim from the community, politicians and police, as well as being awarded a Rockefeller Foundation grant for around $250,000. The CVL even marched with Martin Luther King Jr. Under the leadership of Gore, they adopted values of non-violence, equality and community cooperation.

== Conviction/prison sentence ==
In 1969, Gore was convicted of murder and sent to prison for 10 years. At the time, news stories appeared showing that while Gore was attempting to rebuild the CVL into a peaceful and positive organization, certain elements within the gang continued engaging in criminal activity. After Gore went to prison, the gang openly reverted to its violent nature.

== Community work/later life and death ==
Gore's community work continued after his release in 1979. He refused an offer back into CVL, as he disagreed with the gang's violence and involvement in dealing drugs, believing that this destroys the community and the values he stood for. Gore died of complications from chronic obstructive pulmonary disease on Tuesday, February 12, 2013, in Franciscan St. James Health in Chicago Heights, according to his wife, Etheal. He had lived in south suburban Lynwood, Illinois, for the last 23 years of his life.
