= Jack Gore (rugby) =

GB & Wales international (dual-code) rugby footballer

Personal information
- Full name: John Henry Gore
- Born: 16 June 1899 Blaina, Monmouthshire (historic), Wales
- Died: 18 March 1971 (aged 71) Nantyglo, Monmouthshire (historic), Wales

Playing information

Rugby union
- Position: Flanker
Club
Years	Team	Pld	T	G	FG	P
19??–25	Blaina RFC
Representative
Years	Team	Pld	T	G	FG	P
1924–25	Wales	4	0	0	0	0

Rugby league
- Position: Loose forward
Club
Years	Team	Pld	T	G	FG	P
1925–28	Salford	125				87
1928–32	Wigan Highfield	109				51
	Total	234	0	0	0	138
Representative
Years	Team	Pld	T	G	FG	P
1926–28	Wales	3	3	0	0	9
1927	Great Britain	1	0	0	0	0
- Relatives: Billy Gore (son)

John Henry Gore (16 June 1899 – 18 March 1971) was a Welsh international rugby flanker who played rugby union for Blaina and rugby league for Salford. His son, Billy Gore, played international rugby for Wales national rugby union team the same as his father.

== Rugby career ==
Gore played all his rugby union for the unfashionable lower level club Blaina, though during this period the Welsh selectors would often choose tough manual workers to represent the forward positions. Gore first represented Wales in the 1924 Five Nations Championship in a match at the Cardiff Arms Park against Ireland. Under the captaincy of Jack Wetter, Gore found himself on the losing team which stopped a run of 9 successive home wins for Wales. His second game was against France and although a win for Wales, it was a poor Welsh performance caused by players being thrown out of position by the selectors decision to suspend Ossie Male on the trip to Paris. Gore was selected later in the year to face the touring New Zealand team. Wales were totally outclassed by the All Blacks, though the forwards put on a spirited display.

The next year Gore played his final game for Wales, when he faced England during the 1925 Championship. Wales lost the game 12–6, and Gore played no further international union games. He switched codes to the professional league game when he joined Salford later in 1925.

=== Salford ===
Whilst captain of Salford he played for both England and Wales rugby teams positioned as loose forward. Gore qualified to play for England because of his father's nationality. He was selected as Loose forward for England on the occasion of the Third and Final Test against the All Blacks that was played at Leeds, on January 15th of 1927.

Jack made his début for Salford against St Helens on 28 February 1925 as a Second-row before quickly being switched to loose forward. Gore made 125 appearances for Salford between 1925 and 1928 scoring 29 tries. He played his last game for Salford at Barrow on 9 April 1928.

=== Wigan Highfield ===
He transferred to Wigan Highfield during the close season. Gore then played for Wigan Highfield from 1928 until 1932 making 109 appearances and scoring 17 tries.

=== Monmouthshire ===
Jack Gore played loose forward in Monmouthshire's 14–18 defeat by Glamorgan in the non-County Championship match during the 1926–27 season at Taff Vale Park, Pontypridd on Saturday 30 April 1927.

== Retirement ==
Gore returned to his birth town where he ran the Kings Head public house, High Street, Blaina. Gore was often suspected of being a rugby league spy for Salford. It is reported that he was instrumental in spotting the great Dai Watkins, also from Blaina, who followed Gore to Salford after his days as a Welsh International rugby star.

== International rugby union matches played ==
Wales

- England 19 January 1924. Played at St Helens, Swansea, WALES 9 ENGLAND 17
- Ireland 8 March 1924. Cardiff Arms Park, WALES 10 IRELAND 13
- France 27 March 1924 Colombes, Paris. FRANCE 6 WALES 10
- New Zealand 29 November 1924. St Helens Swansea. WALES 0 NEW ZEALAND 19

Gore was also a Reserve on 2 February 1924. Played at Inverieth, Edinburgh, SCOTLAND 35 WALES 10

== International rugby league matches played ==
Wales

- England 1927, 1928
- New Zealand 6 December 1926. Played at Taff Vale Park Pontypridd (att 18,000). WALES 34 NEW ZEALAND 8 (Gore scored 2 tries)

England

- New Zealand 15 January 1927. Leeds

== Bibliography ==
- Billot, John (1972). All Blacks in Wales. Ferndale: Ron Jones Publications.
- Godwin, Terry (1984). The International Rugby Championship 1883-1983. London: Willows Books. ISBN 0-00-218060-X.
- Smith, David; Williams, Gareth (1980). Fields of Praise: The Official History of The Welsh Rugby Union. Cardiff: University of Wales Press. ISBN 0-7083-0766-3.
