= Gorr =

Gorr may refer to:

- Gorr the God Butcher, a Marvel Comics character, enemy of Thor
  - Gorr (Marvel Cinematic Universe), the Marvel Cinematic Universe version of the character
- Gorr the Golden Gorilla, a Marvel Comics character, enemy of the Fantastic Four
- Gorr (surname)
- Gorr Subdivision, Ontario
- Nór, alternative spelling

== See also ==
- Goar (disambiguation)
- Gor (disambiguation)
- Gore (disambiguation)
