= Goar (name) =

Goar is a given name and surname. Notable people with the name include:

Goar, leader of the Alans in 5th-century Gaul.

== Given name ==
- Goar of Aquitaine (c. 585–649), a priest and hermit of the seventh century; patron saint of innkeepers, potters, and vine growers
- Goar Mestre (1912–1994), Cuban-born Argentine businessman
- Gohar#Goar, transliteration variant of Armenian given name Gohar
  - Goar Hlgatian (born 1975), Armenian chess player
  - Goar Vartanian (1926–2019), Armenian spy

== Surname ==
- Carol Goar (fl. 1986–2016), Canadian journalist
- Jacques Goar (1601–1653), French Dominican and Hellenist
- Jim Goar (born 1975), American poet
- Jot Goar (1870–1947), American professional baseball player

== See also ==
- Gor (disambiguation)
- Gore (disambiguation)
- Gorr (disambiguation)
- Sankt Goar (disambiguation)
