= Gore =

Gore may refer to:

== Places ==
=== Australia ===
- Gore, Queensland
- Gore Creek (New South Wales)
- Gore Island (Queensland)

=== Canada ===
- Gore, Nova Scotia, a rural community
- Gore, Quebec, a township municipality
- Gore Bay, Ontario, a township on Manitoulin Island

=== United Kingdom ===
- Gore Hundred, a historic subdivision of Middlesex
- Kensington Gore, a street in Kensington, West London
  - Gore House, on Kensington Gore
- Gore Water, a tributary of the River Esk, Lothian, which gives its name to Gorebridge

=== United States ===
- Gore, Georgia, an unincorporated community
- Gore, Missouri, an unincorporated community
- Gore, Ohio, an unincorporated community
- Gore, Oklahoma, a town
- Gore, Virginia, an unincorporated community
- Gore Canyon, Colorado
- Gore Creek (Colorado)
- Gore Mountain (New York)
- Gore Mountain (Vermont)
- Gore Range, Colorado
- Goretown, South Carolina, an unincorporated community
- Junction City, Kentucky, formerly known as Gore
- "The Gore", southeast Indiana, a nickname for part of the former Northwest Territory ceded from Ohio to Indiana in 1803, originally Dearborn County
- Gore Township, Michigan

=== Elsewhere ===
- Gorë, a former municipality in Korçë County, Albania
- Goré, Chad, a town
  - Roman Catholic Diocese of Goré, Chad
- Gore District, Upper Canada, an historical district of Upper Canada, now the province of Ontario, Canada
- Gore District, New Zealand, a district in the Southland region of the South Island of New Zealand
  - Gore, New Zealand, a town
- Gore, Ethiopia, a town
- Gore Island (Baja California), Mexico

== People ==
- Gore (given name), including a list of notable people with the given name
- Gore (surname), including a list of notable people with the surname
- Al Gore (born 1948), American politician and environmentalist
- Gore, family name of the Earls of Arran in the Peerage of Ireland
- Gore baronets, in the Baronetage of Ireland
- Gregor Gore Verbinski (born 1964), American film director, screenwriter, producer and musician
- Gore Vidal (1925–2012), American writer
- Lesley Gore (1946–2015), American singer

== Arts, entertainment, and media ==
=== Music ===
- Gore (band), a Dutch rock band formed in 1985
- Gore (Deftones album), 2016, or the title track
- Gore (Lous and the Yakuza album), 2020
- "Gore", a song by Trippie Redd from his 2018 album Life's a Trip

=== Other uses in arts, entertainment, and media ===
- General Gore (character), fictional character in the film Friend of the World by Brian Patrick Butler
- Gore (film), a cancelled biographical film about Gore Vidal
- Gore: Ultimate Soldier, a 2002 first-person shooter video game
- The Unseen (novel), a horror-mystery novel by Joseph Citro, also known as The Gore
- Gore film, a horror genre also known as splatter film
- Gore, colloquial term for recordings and photographs of graphic violence

== Textiles ==
- Gore (fabrics), a triangular piece of cloth used in dress making or hat making
- Gore-Tex, a fabric made by W. L. Gore and Associates
- W. L. Gore and Associates, maker of Gore-Tex fabrics and other industrial products

== Other uses ==
- Gore (heraldry), a roughly triangular charge upon a shield in a coat of arms
- Gore (road), a narrow, triangular area of land often found at road merges and diverges
- Gore (segment), an (often triangular) sector of a curved surface as used to make globes and balloons
- Gore (surveying), a narrow usually triangular strip of land
- HMS Gore, a British frigate which served in the Royal Navy from 1943 to 1946
- Striking spear, or The Gore, a wrestling attack move used by Rhyno

== See also ==
- Goar (disambiguation)
- Gor (disambiguation)
- Goring (disambiguation)
- Gorr (disambiguation)
