= Benjamin ben Meir ha-Levi Ashkenazi =

Benjamin ben Meir ha-Levi Ashkenazi of Nuremberg (fl. early 16th century) was a rabbi active in Salonica.

== Biography ==
Benjamin was born in Germany and was a descendant of Jacob Moelin. He later settled in Salonica. Despite his German origin, he was held in high regard by the Spanish and Portuguese Jews of the city. He was appointed by the entire Jewish community of Salonica to serve as their representative on a diplomatic mission to Constantinople.

Benjamin's responsa appear in contemporary collections. He also composed lexical commentaries on the maḥzor according to the Ashkenazic rite, which were published in Salonica in 1526 and in 1555–1556. The latter edition also included several of his elegies, including one written after the great fire that devastated Salonica in 1553.
