= Gor (disambiguation) =

Gor is a fictional planet in John Norman's fantasy novels.

Gor or GOR may also refer to:

== Languages ==
- Gor language, spoken in Chad
- Gorontalo language, spoken on Sulawesi, Indonesia (ISO 639:gor)

== Mythology ==
- Gór, a legendary Norse ancestral hero, brother of Nór
- Gor, a mythical elephant in Pygmy Mbuti mythology

== Media, arts and entertainment ==
- Gor (film), a science fiction and fantasy film, 1987
- Gor Saga, a 1981 novel by Maureen Duffy, televised as First Born
- Gor (Marvel Cinematic Universe), a character in Jessica Jones

=== Sports ===
- Global Ocean Race, a yachting race
- Gor Mahia F.C., a football club based in Nairobi, Kenya

== People ==
=== Given name ===
- Gor Agbaljan (born 1997), Armenian footballer
- Gor Malakyan (born 1994), Armenian footballer
- Gor Minasyan (born 1994), Armenian weightlifter
- Gor Mkhitarian (born 1973), Armenian musician
- Gor Sujyan (born 1987), Armenian singer
- Gor Vardanyan (born 1972), Armenian actor

=== Surname ===
- Avika Gor (born 1997), Indian actress
- Gennady Gor (1907–1981), Russian writer
- Lokman Gör (born 1990), Turkish footballer
- Priyal Gor (born 1994), Indian actress
- Pooja Gor (born 1991), Indian actress
- Sergio Gor (born 1986), Maltese-American businessman and political operative
- Yakup Gör (born 1988), Turkish wrestler

== Places ==
- Gōr, an ancient city in Iran
- Gor, Granada, Spain
- Gór, Hungary
- Gor, Sikkim, India
- Gor, an ancient city, now Drâa-El-Gamra, Tunisia

== Transport ==
- Gore Airport, Ethiopia
- GOR, the London Underground code for Goldhawk Road tube station, London, England
- Goring & Streatley railway station, Oxfordshire, England
- Gor-class gunboat, in the Royal Norwegian Navy, 1884–1887
- HNoMS Gor, two ships of the Royal Norwegian Navy

== Other uses ==
- GOR method, in bioinformatics
- Gas oil ratio
- German Operations Research Society (German: Gesellschaft für Operations Research)
- Duke of Gor, a Spanish title of nobility

== See also ==
- Goar (disambiguation)
- Goor (disambiguation)
- Gore (disambiguation)
- Goring (disambiguation)
- Gorr (disambiguation)
- Gaur (disambiguation)
