= Sankt Goar (disambiguation) =

Sankt Goar or St. Goar may refer to:

- Saint Goar of Aquitaine
- Sankt Goar, a town in Rhineland-Palatinate, Germany
- Sankt Goar line, an isogloss separating dialects in Germany
- Sankt Goar-Oberwesel, a former collective municipality in Rhineland-Palatinate, Germany

== See also ==
- Sankt Goarshausen
