= Bennington Triangle =

Area in the U.S. state of Vermont

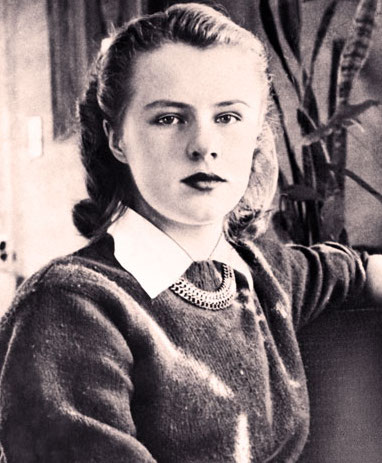
Circulated photograph of Paula Jean Welden; clipping from missing persons flyers.

"Bennington Triangle" is a phrase coined by American author Joseph A. Citro to denote an area of southwestern Vermont within which a number of people went missing between 1945 and 1950. This was further popularized in two books, including Shadow Child, in which Citro devoted chapters to discussion of these disappearances and various items of folklore surrounding the area. According to Citro, the area shares characteristics with the Bridgewater Triangle in Southeastern Massachusetts and stories of strange happenings had been told about Glastenbury and the surrounding area for many years, the best-known of which is probably that of the disappearance of Paula Jean Welden.

Precisely what area is encompassed in this hypothetical "mystery triangle" is not clear, but it is purportedly centered on Glastenbury Mountain and would include some or most of the area of the towns immediately surrounding it, especially Bennington, Woodford, Shaftsbury, and Somerset. Glastenbury and its neighboring township Somerset were both once moderately thriving logging and industrial towns, but began declining toward the late 19th century and are now essentially ghost towns, unincorporated by an act of the Vermont General Assembly in 1937. Robert Singley, a 27-year-old Bennington College student got lost in the area but was found safe by Vermont State Police in 2008.

== Reported disappearances ==
=== Middie Rivers (1945) ===
The first disappearance occurred on November 12, 1945, when 74-year-old Middie Rivers vanished while hunting in Bickford Hollow, about four miles east of Bennington and north of Vermont Route 9 near Woodford. Rivers was a skilled outdoorsman who frequented his son-in-law's hunting camp on the Long Trail and was described by friends as well-acquainted with the area. Around 4 PM on November 9, 1945, Rivers was seen by a friend on a nearby trail walking in a direction opposite to camp. When he failed to return that evening, a search party was launched. Extensive searches were conducted that autumn and included volunteers from Fort Devens and from the Vermont State Guard. A search party leader anticipated finding Rivers' remains, noting that numerous people had been lost in the region in recent decades but all had eventually been recovered. The only evidence discovered however, was Rivers' handkerchief found by a hiker the following spring along a trail south of his last known location.

=== Paula Welden (1946) ===
Paula Jean Welden, 18, was last seen on December 1, 1946, about two miles south of the area where Rivers vanished the previous year. Welden, a sophomore at Bennington College, left campus early in the afternoon, walking and hitchhiking six miles to the Long Trail which, at that time, crossed Route 9 near Harbour Road. One of the last confirmed sightings of Welden was by a local man who gave her a ride from the college to a site on Route 9 about two miles west of the Long Trail. Several other witnesses claimed to have encountered her on or near the trail, including a Bennington Banner employee who gave her directions. She was dressed in a red jacket, jeans, and lightweight sneakers, but was not carrying any camping gear or clothing appropriate for frigid temperatures. Welden failed to attend class the following morning and an extensive search was eventually launched, which included the posting of a $5,000 reward and help from the FBI, but no evidence of her was ever found. Welden's disappearance was the inspiration for the 1951 novel Hangsaman by Shirley Jackson.

=== James Tedford (1949) ===
James Tedford, a 68-year-old World War I veteran, went missing on December 1, 1949, three years to the day after Welden was last seen. Tedford, a resident of the Vermont Soldiers' Home in Bennington, had been in St. Albans visiting relatives who accompanied him to the local bus station and observed him boarding a southbound bus. The last confirmed sighting of Tedford was at the bus depot in Burlington where he had a brief conversation with an acquaintance before transferring to a Bennington-bound bus at about 6:15 PM. The bus driver later reported to police that a man resembling Tedford may have disembarked in the village of Brandon about 70 miles north of Bennington while, that same night, Brandon police investigated a report of a man fitting Tedford's description "acting queerly" in the village's downtown. Tedford's disappearance went unreported for one week until the superintendent of the Bennington Soldiers' Home notified police on December 8. Newspaper reports indicated that Tedford was mentally ill at the time of his disappearance and his family stated that he was "despondent" about returning to Bennington. Author Tony Jinks discusses Tedford's disappearance, saying that "The popular conception is that he vanished into thin air while on the bus, but like many missing person stories there's a gap between when he was last seen and when he was reported missing a week or so later. Regarding Tedford's disappearance, there is enough evidence to suggest he did not "dematerialize", even though no trace of him was ever found."

=== Paul Jepson (1950) ===
On October 12, 1950, Paul "Buddy" Jepson, a special needs child aged 8, vanished while accompanying his mother on farm chores. At about 3 PM, his mother drove with him to the Bennington town dump where the family kept a herd of pigs. She left him unattended in the vehicle for about 30 minutes while she tended to the animals but when she returned around 4 PM, he was missing. Authorities initially focused their search on the dump and surrounding woods, but a bloodhound later tracked Jepson's scent along an adjacent road to an intersection where the trail abruptly ended. Police theorized that rain may have washed away the scent while Jepson's father speculated that a driver may have accidentally struck the boy and taken him from the scene in a panic. He also stated that searchers might have overlooked Paul in nearby woods because his brown and tan clothing blended in with the fall leaves.

=== Frieda Langer (1950) ===
On October 28, 1950, sixteen days after Jepson vanished, Frieda Langer, aged 53, went missing while hiking in the woods near Somerset. A skilled hiker and hunter, Langer had accompanied her husband, Max, and cousin, Herbert Elsner, that morning from their home in North Adams to the family cabin on the shores of Somerset Reservoir. While hiking with Elsner around 1 PM, Langer slipped and fell into a stream, soaking her clothing. She stated to Elsner that she intended to take a shortcut back to the cabin to change her clothes and would catch up with him later. When she failed to return, a search was initiated which included aircraft, helicopters, and up to 300 searchers. Langer suffered from a seizure disorder and her husband speculated that exposure to cold temperatures may have triggered a seizure, causing her to become disorented and lost in the woods. On May 12, 1951, fishermen found Langer's body three and a half miles southeast from the campsite on the shore of eastern branch of the Deerfield River in an area that had been only lightly searched previously. While no cause of death could be determined because of the condition of her remains, an investigator theorized that Langer had fallen down an embankment into a deep pond where she drowned and her body had then been flushed out months later by a spring freshet.

== In popular culture ==
During the investigation into Jepson's disappearance in 1950, journalists in the Bennington region noted the previous three cases and speculated about possible connections between them. In November, 1950, the Bennington Evening Banner published an article suggesting the region might contain a “Lost Horizon”, referencing James Hilton's popular 1933 novel, in which a group of people become lost in a mystical mountainous area of Tibet. The events of 1945 to 1950 are told in episode 67 of Lore, titled "The Red Coats". The case was featured as one of the haunted locations in the paranormal TV series Most Terrifying Places in America which aired on the Travel Channel in 2018. The episode, title "Unnatural World" told the stories about the reportedly missing persons in a five-year span, and local lore of the "Bennington Monster", a Bigfoot-like creature that supposedly roams these wooded areas.
