= Old Gore, Ohio =

Unincorporated community in Ohio, U.S.

Old Gore
- Unincorporated community
- Interactive map of Old Gore
- Coordinates: 39°34′39″N 82°18′18″W
- Country: United States
- State: Ohio
- County: Hocking

Old Gore is an unincorporated community in Hocking County, in the U.S. state of Ohio.

== History ==
Old Gore was originally called Gore. When a blast furnace was built nearby at Hamlin/Burgessville, the latter two rival towns merged to become "New Gore".
