= Goor (disambiguation) =

Goor is a city in the province of Overijssel, Netherlands

Goor may also refer to:

== Places ==
- Heist-Goor, a village in the province of Antwerp, Belgium
- Goor (Rügen), a forest on Rügen island in Germany

== People ==
- Bart Goor (born 1973), Belgian former professional footballer
- Dan Goor (born 1975), American comedy writer and television producer
- Keren Goor (born 1998), American-born Israeli footballer
- Yvan Goor (1884–1958), Belgian cyclist and motorcyclist

== See also ==
- Gor (disambiguation)
- Van Goor, a Dutch surname
