= Shadow Child (novel) =

1987 novel by Joseph A. Citro

- First edition (publ. Zebra Books)
- Author: Joseph A. Citro
- Language: English
- Genre: Horror fiction
- Publisher: Zebra Books
- Publication date: 1987
- Publication place: United States
- Pages: 367 (first edition)
- ISBN: 9780821721179

Shadow Child is a novel by American horror and paranormal folklore author Joseph A. Citro. It was originally published on July 1, 1987, before his novel Lake Monsters, but was republished by University Press of New England on September 1, 1998. The novel depicts the psychological and emotional impacts of mysterious disappearances and deaths.

== Plot ==
The main character is Eric Nolan, brother, son, and widower. After the death of his parents, the death of his wife, and his brother's disappearance, Eric decides to move back to his childhood home in Bennington County, Vermont where his cousin Pamela lives with her own family. Mysterious things start happening in the nearby woods, part of the Bennington Triangle that is known for several unsolved disappearances.
