= Sankt Goar =

- Town
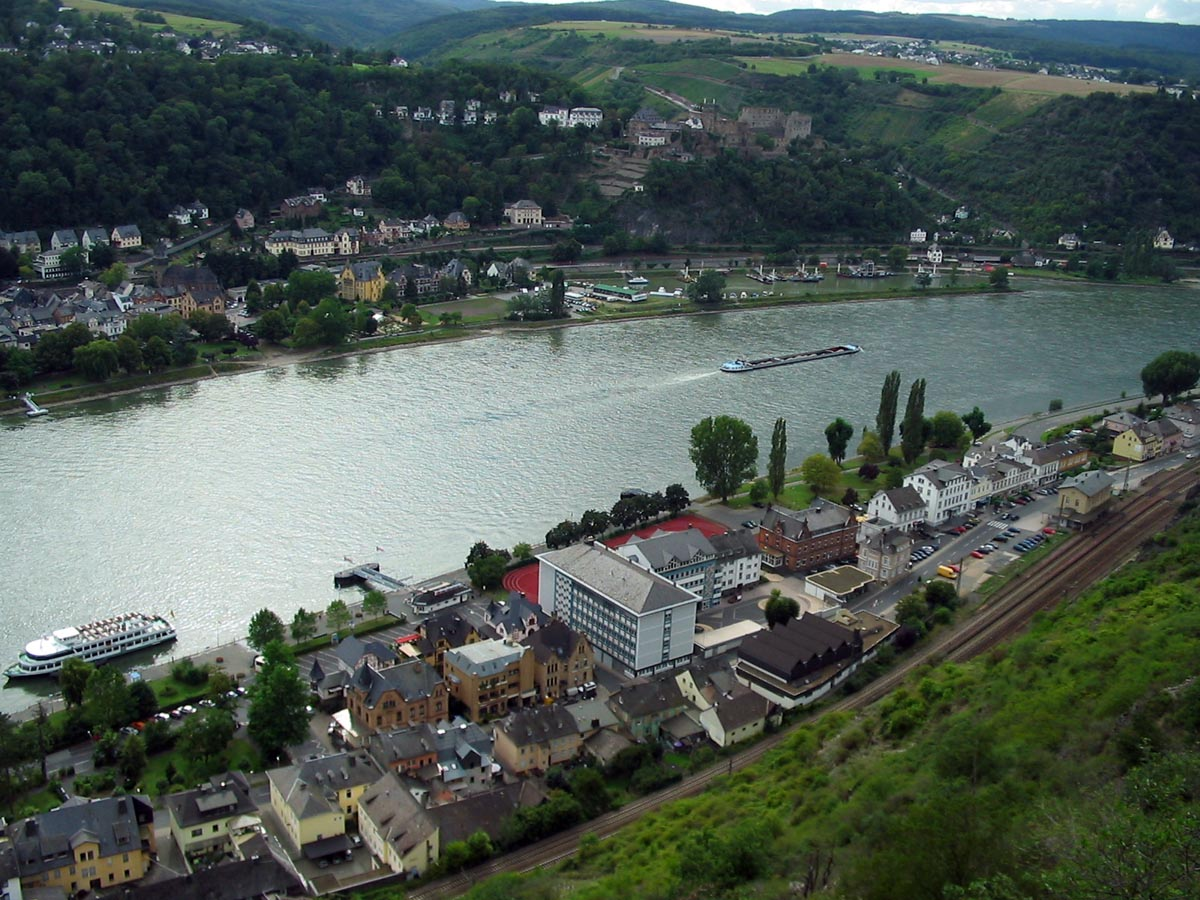
- View of St. Goar (in top half of picture) from Patersberg

- Coat of arms

- Location of Sankt Goar within Rhein-Hunsrück-Kreis district
- Interactive map of Sankt Goar
- Location within Germany Location within Rhineland-Palatinate
- Coordinates: 50°9′N 7°43′E
- Country: Germany
- State: Rhineland-Palatinate
- District: Rhein-Hunsrück-Kreis
- Municipal assoc.: Hunsrück-Mittelrhein
- Subdivisions: 4

Government
  - Mayor (2019–24): Falko Hönisch (SPD)

Area
  - Total: 23.17 km^{2} (8.95 sq mi)
- Elevation: 74 m (243 ft)

Population (2025-12-31)
  - Total: 2,860
  - Density: 123/km^{2} (320/sq mi)
- Time zone: UTC+01:00 (CET)
  - Summer (DST): UTC+02:00 (CEST)
- Postal codes: 56329
- Dialling codes: 06741
- Vehicle registration: SIM, GOA
- Website: www.st-goar.de

Sankt Goar (German pronunciation: [zaŋkt ɡoˈaːɐ̯]) is a town on the west bank of the Middle Rhine in the Rhein-Hunsrück-Kreis (district) in Rhineland-Palatinate, Germany. It belongs to the Verbandsgemeinde Hunsrück-Mittelrhein, whose seat is in Emmelshausen.

Sankt Goar is well known for its central location in the Rhine Gorge, a UNESCO World Heritage Site since July 2002. Above the town stand the ruins of Burg Rheinfels, one of the castles for which the Middle Rhine is famous, and across the river lies the sister town of Sankt Goarshausen with its own castles, Katz and Maus (“Cat” and “Mouse”). The famous Lorelei rock is close by, slightly upstream on the opposite bank.

== Geography ==
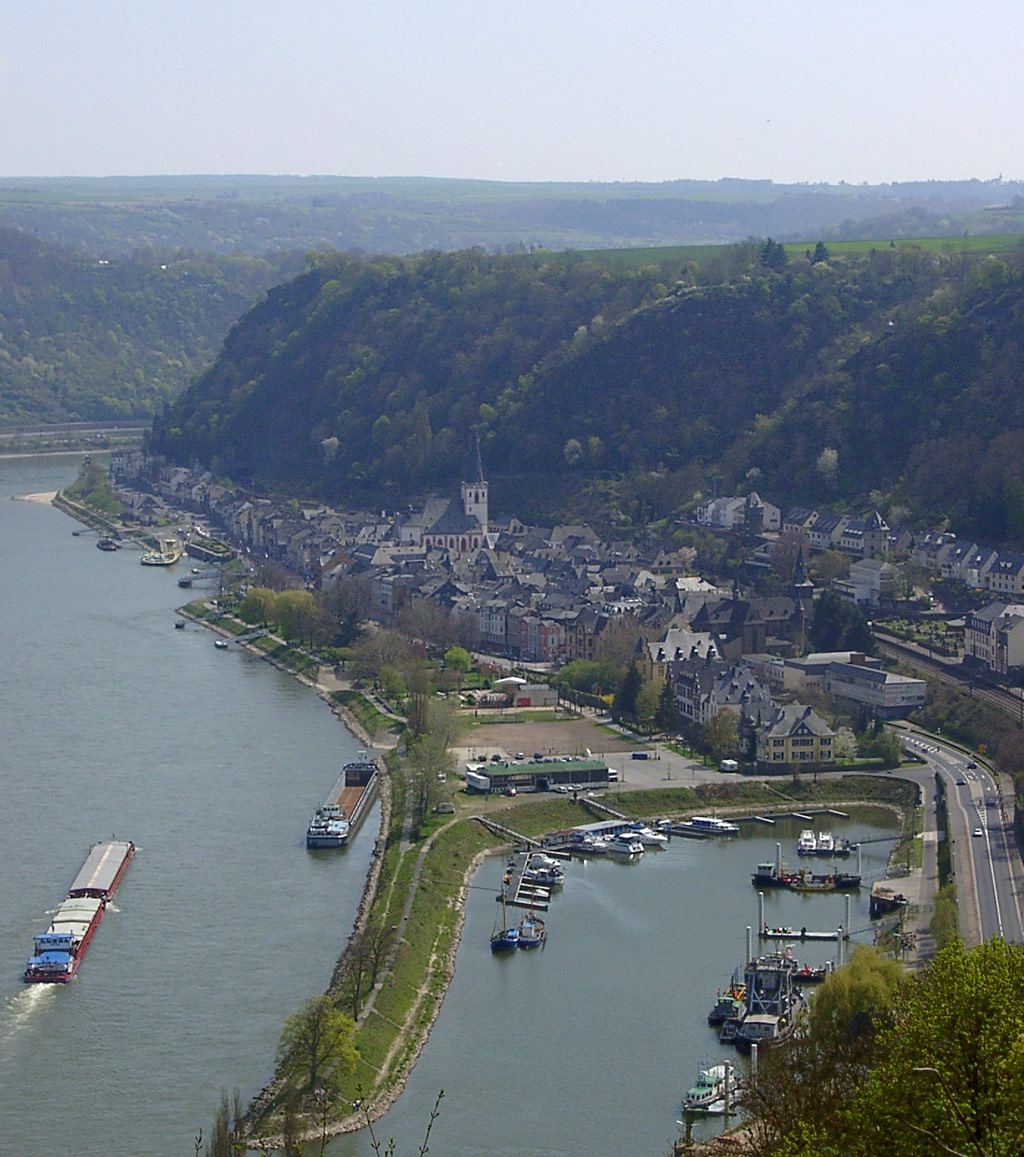
Sankt Goar seen from the northwest

=== Location ===
Sankt Goar lies in the Rhine Gorge and the narrow canal on the Rhine that flows through the Rhein Massive. This part of the gorge on the left bank borders on the edge of the Rhein - Hunsrück, on the right bank it Borders on the Banks of the Taunus. The characteristic narrow-valley form came into use through downcutting in a massif that was undergoing an uplift.

The nearest major Towns are the city of Koblenz, some 24 km to the north, and the town of Bingen am Rhein, some 25 km to the southeast, in both cases as the crow flies. Sankt Goar is linked by the Loreley Ferry with its sister town of Sankt Goarshausen directly across the Rhine. The Rhine's width here is roughly 250 m.

In Sankt Goar and the Gründelbach, Rainwater flows from the Hunsrück and empties into the Rhine.

=== Constituent communities ===
The town is made up of several parts that belong to St. Goar, The main centre on the Rhine, also called Sankt Goar, two centres up on the heights, Biebernheim and Werlau, and two further centres on the Rhine, Fellen to the north and “An der Loreley” to the south.

== History ==
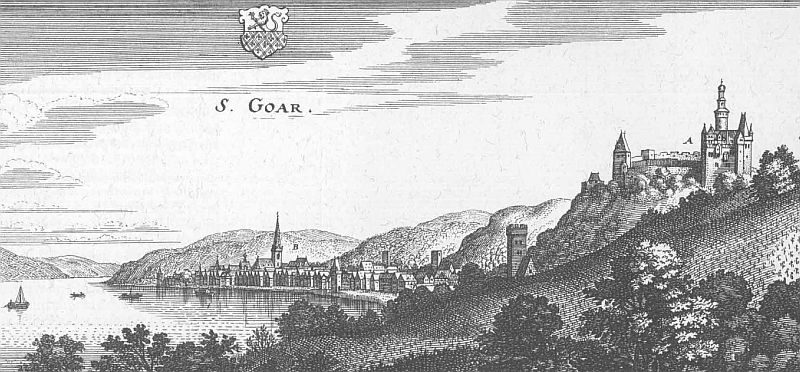
St. Goar – excerpt from Matthäus Merian’s Topographia Hassiae (1655)

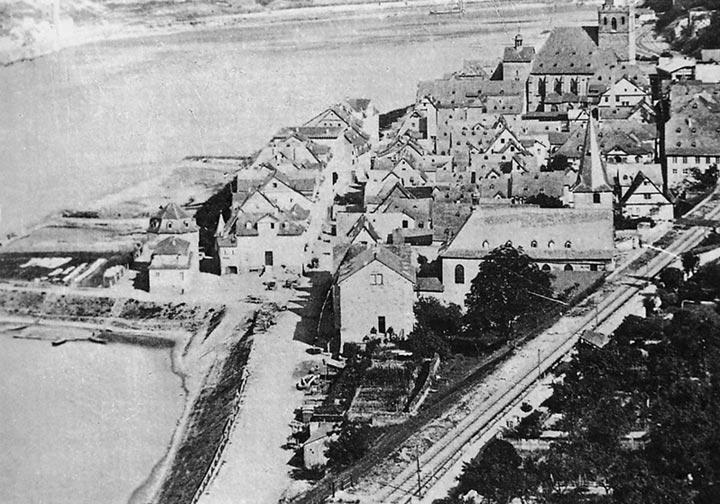
Sankt Goar about 1860; at left, above the harbour basin, is the eight-sided treadmill crane from the 16th century

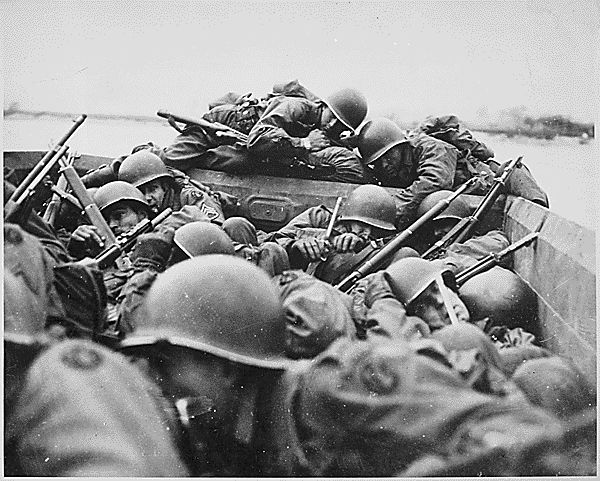
Soldiers of the US Army's 89th Infantry Division crossing the Rhine near Sankt Goar under enemy fire

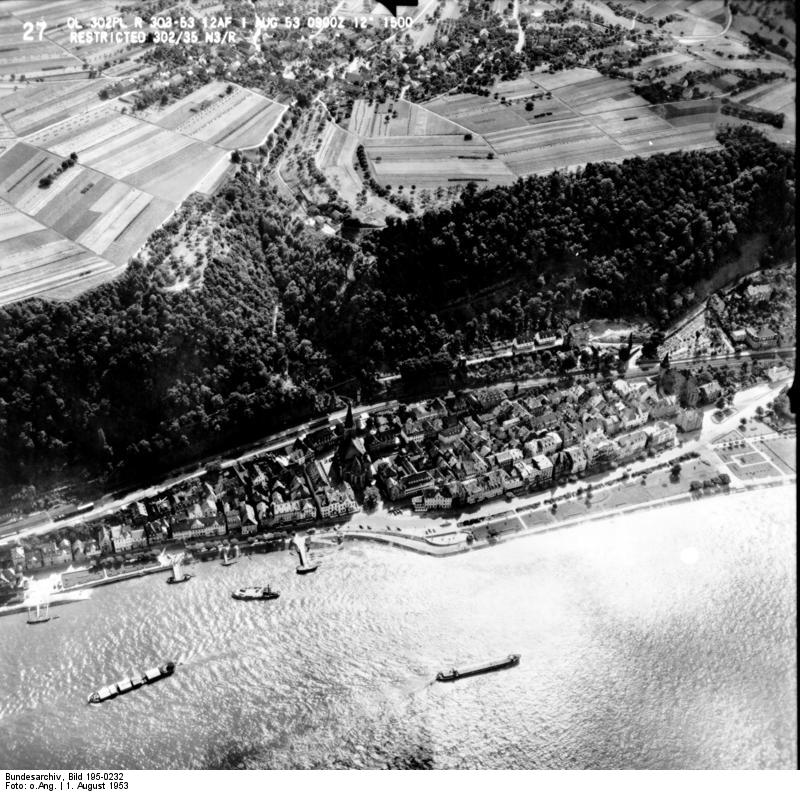
Aerial view, 1953

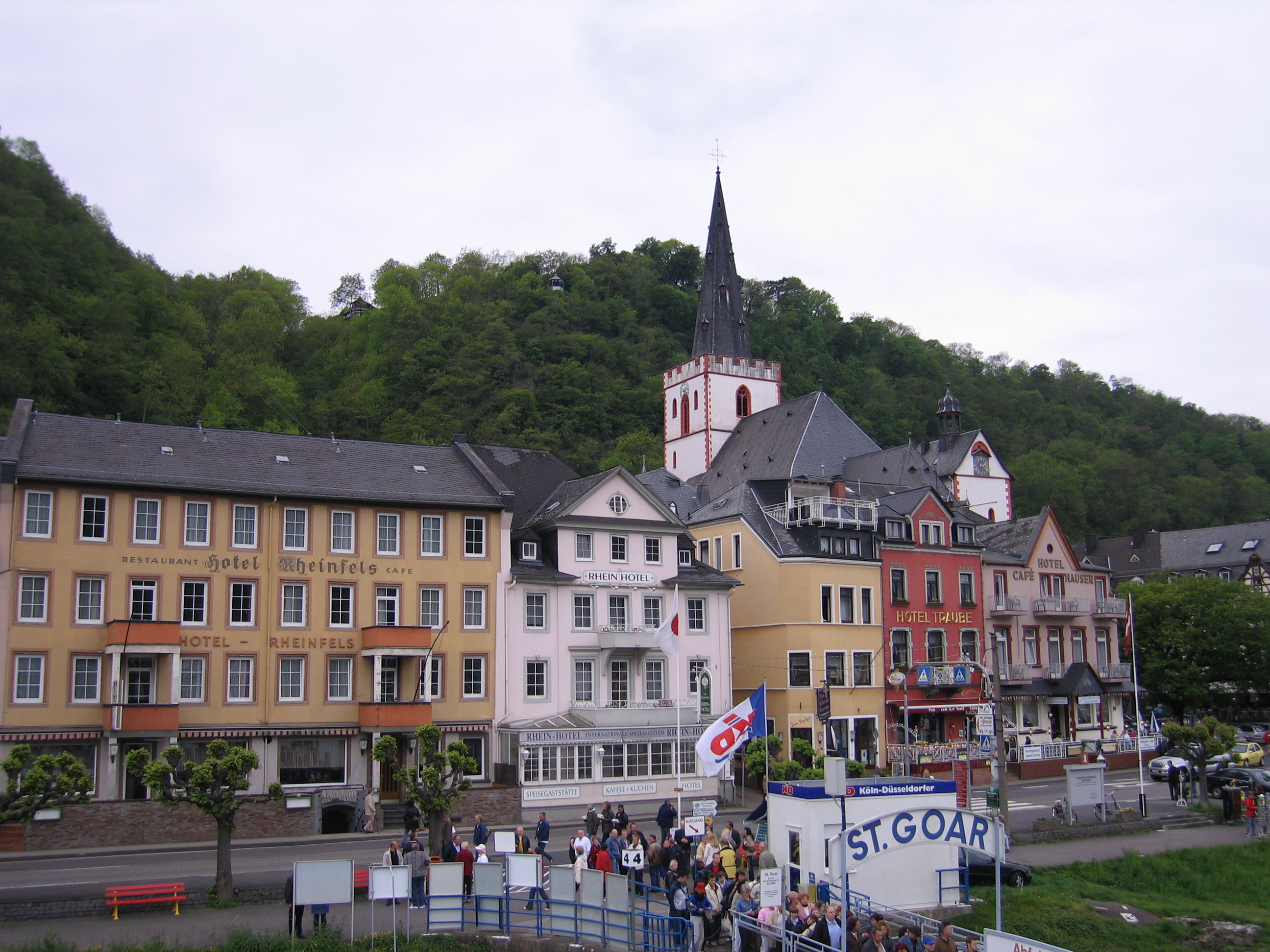
Sankt Goar from the Rhine

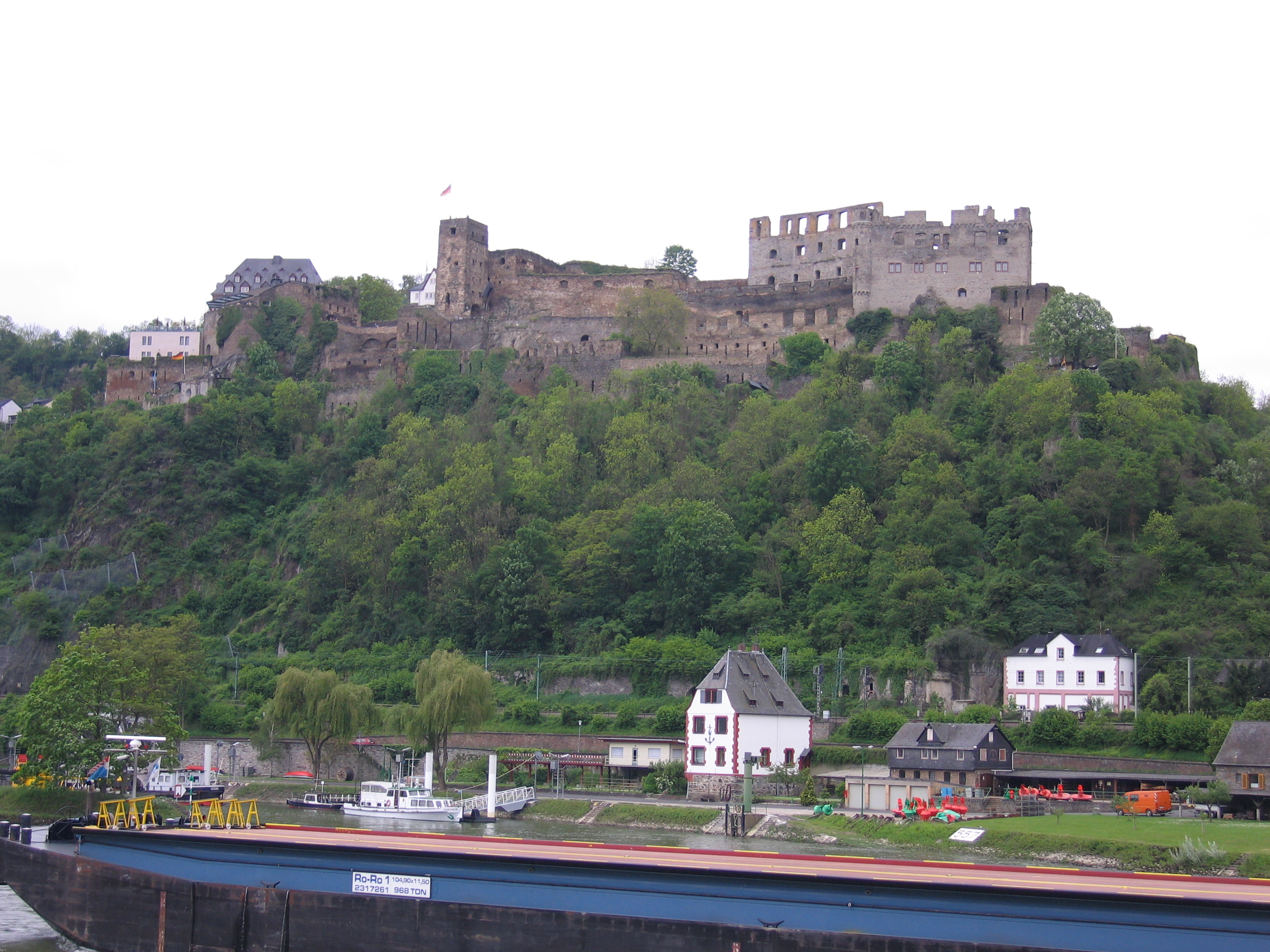
Burg Rheinfels high above the Rhine

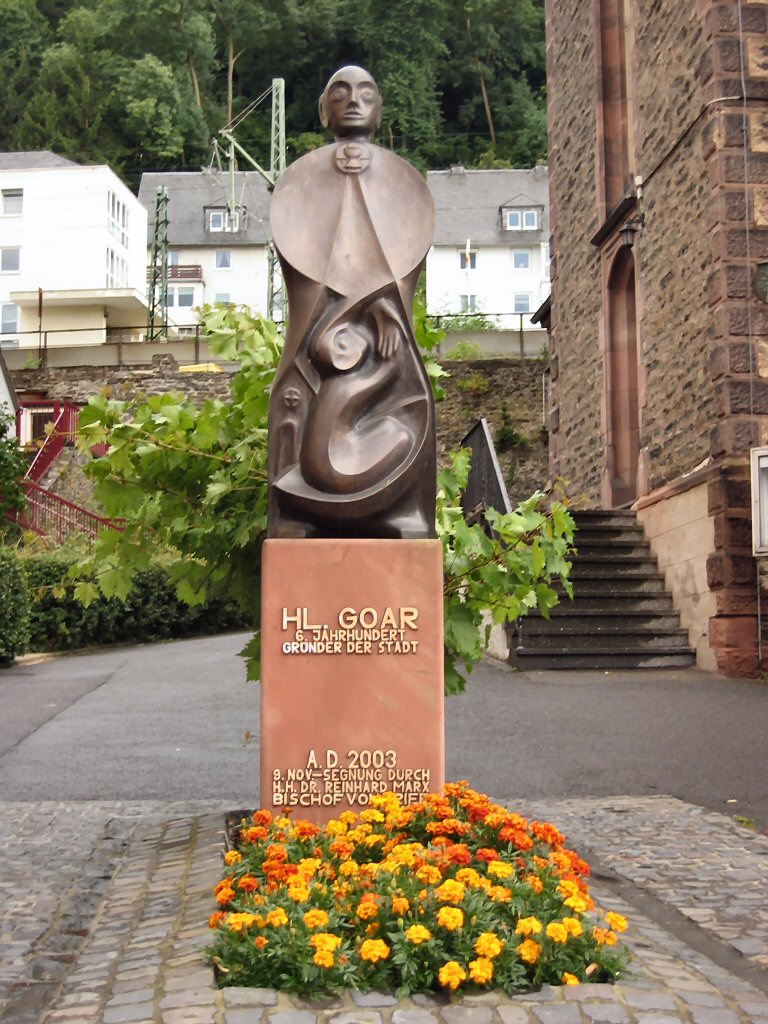
Monument to the town’s namesake

The area around what is now the town of Sankt Goar was already settled in Roman times. The name in the Early Middle Ages was Wochara, after a short brook emptying into the Rhine here.

The name by which the town goes today is from Goar of Aquitaine, who came to live on the site where the town now stands during Frankish, Merovingian King Childebert I’s reign (511–538). Goar came as a young clergyman (actually, a monk) from Aquitaine in the southwest of France and at first lived as a hermit in a cave on the Rhine. With leave from the Bishop of Trier, he worked as a missionary to the local people. He was well known for his great hospitality, particularly towards the Rhine boatmen. Later, he built on the site where the town now stands a hospice and a chapel. Many legends gathered about him. After his death, about 649, Goar’s grave became a pilgrimage site and the place was named after him. Frankish King Pepin the Younger transferred the hospice and chapel in 765 to the Abbot of the Benedictine Prüm Abbey as a personal benefice. From this grew the Sankt Goar Canonical Foundation, witnessed as early as the late 11th century.

The Catholic Encyclopedia notes that “a small church” was dedicated to Goar of Aquitaine in 1768 “in the little town on the banks of the Rhine which bears his name (St. Goar).” It is also reported that Charlemagne built a church over the site of Goar's hermitage. It is around this church that the town of Sankt Goar grew on the left bank of the Rhine between Wesel and Boppard.

Beginning in 1190, the town was under military protection and the jurisdiction of the Counts of Katzenelnbogen, the monastery Vögte, who had taken ownership. In 1245, Count Diether V of Katzenelnbogen built the castle, Burg Rheinfels. When the last of the Counts of Katzenelnbogen died in 1479, Sankt Goar passed to the Landgraviate of Hesse.

The earliest known written records mentioning the existence of a local Jewish community date from this period.

On 1 November 1527, Adam Krafft, who would later be a professor of theology, began to introduce the Reformation on a mission from Philip I, Landgrave of Hesse. In 1567, upon Philip's death, the Landgraviate of Hesse was divided among his four sons. His youngest son, Philip II, Landgrave of Hesse-Rheinfels, was awarded the Lower County of Katzenelnbogen, and thereby the castle and the town. In 1580, 175 people in Sankt Goar fell victim to the Plague; only 18 years later, in 1598, it claimed another 142. In 1635, in the midst of the Thirty Years' War, more than 200 people died in another outbreak. In 1598, Franz Schmoll built the Rheinfels-Apotheke in Sankt Goar, only the third apothecary in Hesse, after the ones in Kassel and Marburg.

As a result of a longstanding dispute between Hesse-Kassel and Hesse-Darmstadt over the partitioning of the Landgraviate of Hesse, the latter had Burg Rheinfels and Sankt Goar besieged for several weeks in the summer of 1626 with help from Imperial troops. which eventually led to the town's capitulation and its attendant plundering by Spanish troops. Between 1626 and 1647, Sankt Goar belonged to Hesse-Darmstadt. In 1647, troops of Landgravine Amalie Elisabeth of Hesse-Kassel conquered the castle and the town. On 14 April 1648, George II, Landgrave of Hesse-Darmstadt ceded the Lower County of Katzenelnbogen along with Sankt Goar “in perpetuity” to Hesse-Kassel.

While Hesse-Kassel was under Imperial law the rightful landholder, lordship over the Lower County of Katzenelnbogen passed to Landgrave Ernst I, who on 30 March 1649 made his entrance into Sankt Goar and founded the Hesse-Rheinfels(-Rotenburg) line. Landgrave Ernst ruled until his death in 1693 at Burg Rheinfels, his comital residence, as one who was tolerant in matters of religion, and one who took great interest in his office, contributing considerably to Sankt Goar's economic growth, something the town sorely needed after the ravages that it had sustained in the Thirty Years' War. In the Nine Years' War (known in Germany as the Pfälzischer Erbfolgekrieg, or War of the Palatine Succession), however, the town and the castle lay under siege yet again, this time by 28,000 French troops. Despite attempts at storming the town, they could not penetrate its defences. In 1711, after a dispute over inheritance, Landgrave William of Hesse-Wanfried was awarded the Landgraviate of Hesse-Rheinfels; he then called himself William of Hesse-Rheinfels. The Emperor transferred the castle to him in 1718. In 1731, Christian of Hessen-Wanfried (known since 1711 as Hessen-Eschwege) inherited the Landgraviate of Hesse-Rheinfels along with the castle. The castle was ceded to Hesse-Kassel for good in 1735. In 1755, after Christian's death, the Landgraviate passed to the Landgraviate of Hesse-Rotenburg. In 1794, the castle was given up to French Revolutionary troops without a fight, and in 1796 and 1797, great parts of it were blown up. French rule lasted until 1813.

In 1815, the castle passed into Prussian hands and Sankt Goar became a district seat. After the First World War, the town was for a while once again occupied by the French. The Second World War, too, came to Sankt Goar. In mid March 1945, American troops reached the town and occupied it, although occupational authority was transferred, once again, to the French in early July. Since 1946, Sankt Goar has been part of the then newly founded state of Rhineland-Palatinate. In the course of administrative restructuring in Rhineland-Palatinate, the district of Sankt Goar, whose seat the town had been, was dissolved in 1969 and the town was grouped into the Rhein-Hunsrück-Kreis, whose seat was in Simmern. In 1972, the town also became part of the Verbandsgemeinde of Sankt Goar-Oberwesel.

=== Amalgamations ===
In the course of administrative restructuring, the new Verbandsgemeinde of Sankt Goar-Oberwesel was formed on 22 April 1972 out of the towns of Sankt Goar and Oberwesel, with its seat in the latter town.

On 7 June 1969, the formerly self-administering municipalities of Biebernheim and Werlau were amalgamated with Sankt Goar.

=== Population development ===
The table shows population figures for selected years since the early 17th century.

Historical population

Year	Pop.	±%
1613	1,134	—
1640	714	−37.0%
1794	1,992	+179.0%
1815	1,108	−44.4%
1847	1,452	+31.0%

Year	Pop.	±%
1867	1,330	−8.4%
1885	1,453	+9.2%
1903	1,673	+15.1%
1970	3,546	+112.0%
1998	3,213	−9.4%

Year	Pop.	±%
2001	3,147	−2.1%
2003	3,128	−0.6%
2007	2,905	−7.1%
2013	2,713	−6.6%

== Politics ==
=== Town council ===
The council is made up of 20 council members, who were elected by proportional representation at the municipal election held on 7 June 2009, and the honorary mayor as chairman.

The municipal election held on 7 June 2009 yielded the following results:

	SPD	CDU	FDP	Total
2009	9	9	2	20 seats
2004	8	11	1	20 seats

The voter turnout for this latest municipal election was 61.0%. This contrasts with 67.5% in 2004 and 70.4% in 1999.

=== Mayor ===
Sankt Goar's mayor is Falko Hönisch (SPD).

=== Coat of arms ===
The German blazon reads: Im geteilten Schild oben in Gold ein blaubewehrter roter Löwe (heraldisch Leopard), unten hinter einem goldenen Gitter goldene Lilien auf blauen Feld.

The town's arms might in English heraldic language be described thus: Per fess Or a demilion guardant gules armed, langued and crowned azure, and azure trellised with each space charged with a fleur-de-lis of the first.

The charge in the upper part of the escutcheon is the heraldic emblem formerly borne by the Counts of Katzenelnbogen, who ruled Sankt Goar from the 13th century. Sankt Goar was the centre of the Lower County of Katzenelnbogen. The lilies in the lower part of the escutcheon refer to Saint Mary's patronage of Darmstadt, the centre of the Upper County of Katzenelnbogen.

The town colours are red and white.

=== Town partnerships ===
Sankt Goar fosters partnerships with the following places:

- Châtillon-en-Bazois, Nièvre, France since 1973

== Culture and sightseeing ==
=== Buildings ===
The following are listed buildings or sites in Rhineland-Palatinate’s Directory of Cultural Monuments:

==== Sankt Goar (main centre) ====
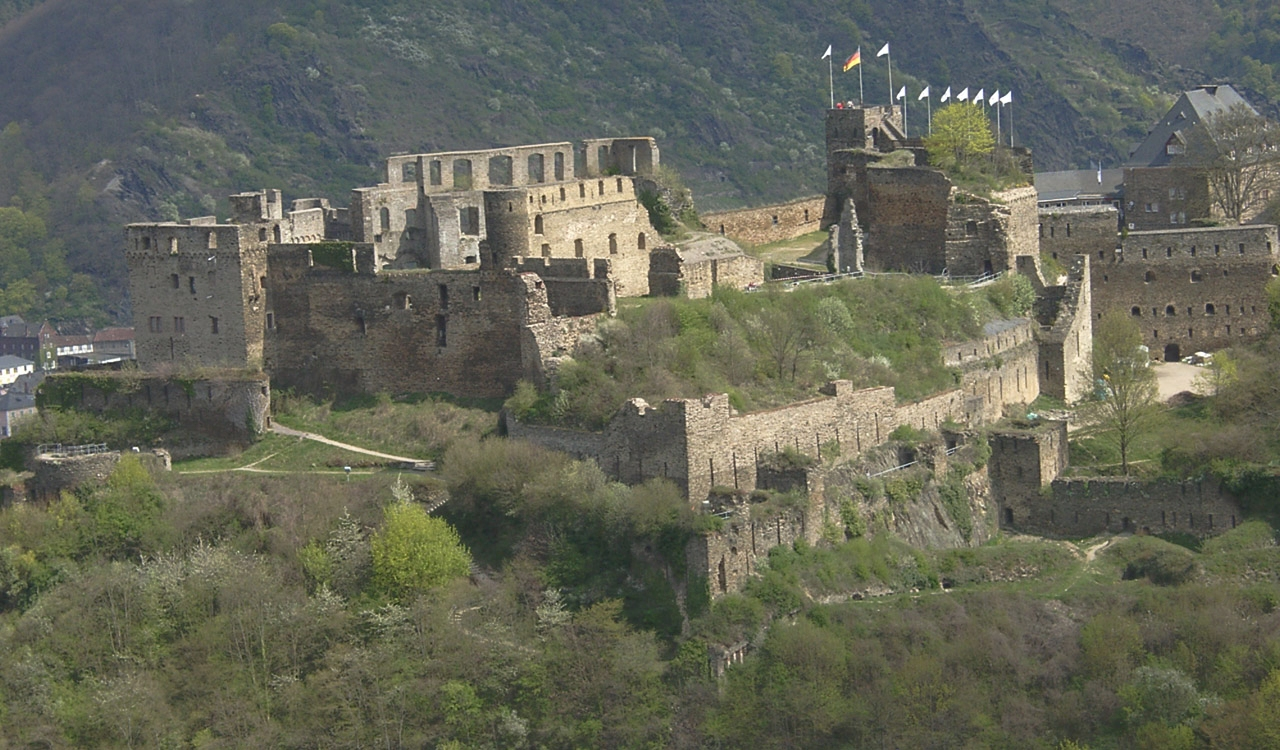
Sankt Goar, Burg Rheinfels monumental zone

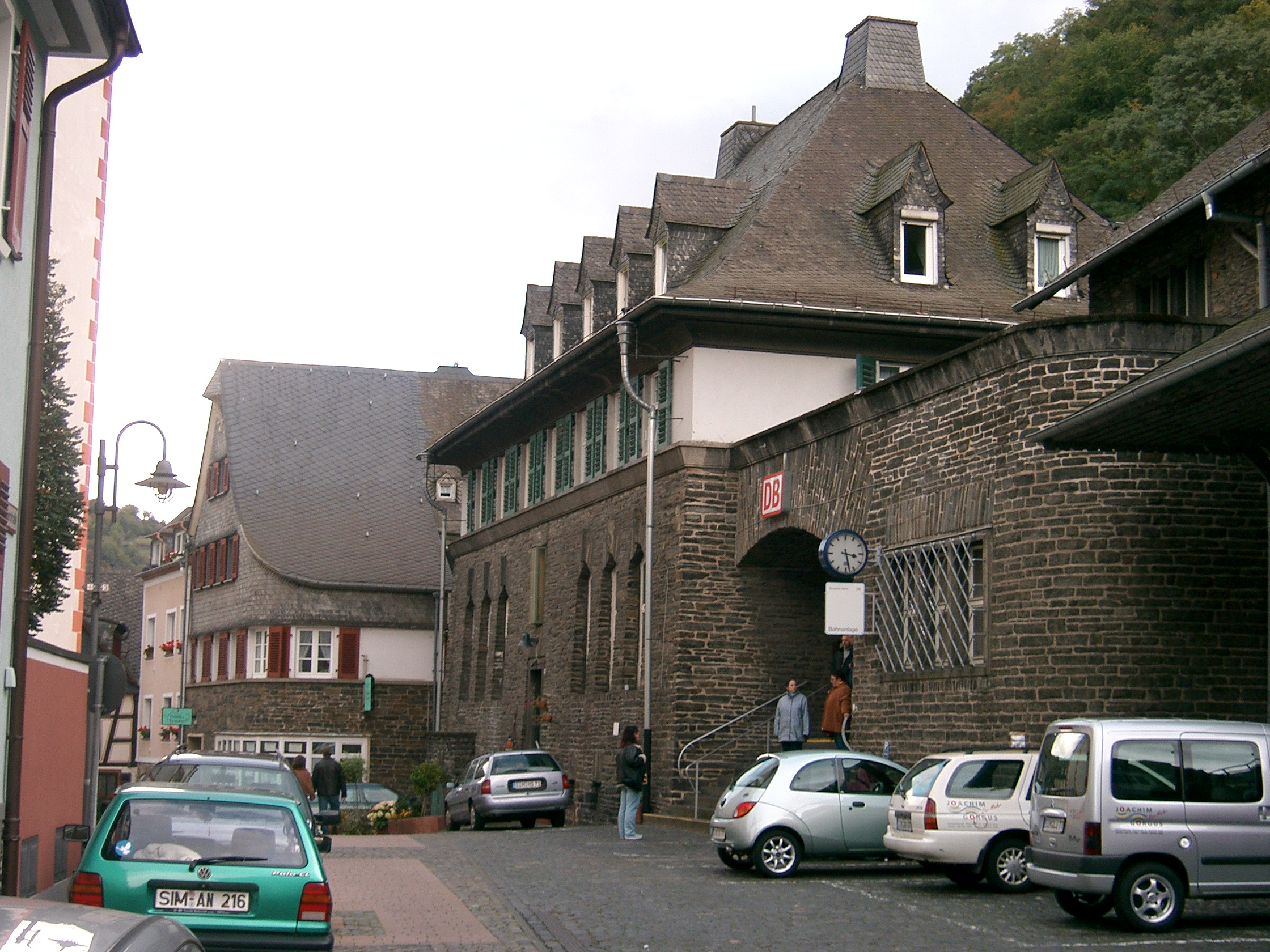
Sankt Goar, Oberstraße 32: railway station

- Burg Rheinfels (monumental zone) – one of the biggest castle ruins on the Rhine, noteworthy both for the castle-building technique of the Counts of Katzenelnbogen in the 14th century and for the palatial and fortification building work done in the 16th and 18th centuries by the Landgraves of Hesse-Kassel
  Founded in 1245 by Count Diether of Katzenelnbogen on the site of an older valley castle; in the 13th and 14th centuries expanded into a residence for the Lower County, in the 14th and 15th centuries a midpoint on the Rhine; 1567-1583 residence of Landgrave Philip II of Hesse-Rheinfels; from 1796 demolished by explosives in stages and used as a stone quarry
  Four-sided inner castle with keep preserved only as a foundation; keep built up in 14th century into the “butterchurn shape” (that is, with a thinner turret on top), Frauenbau (“Women’s Building”), shield wall with two towers; from 1480 to 1527 expanded into a fort; partial moat between inner castle and shielding wall covered by barrel vaulting, on the Rhine and Gründelbach valley sides outlying defences, at the Biebernheimer Feld, outer defences; about 1570/1580 expanded into Renaissance residence; early 17th century mine tunnels (among other things); in the latter half of the 17th century further expansion, 1657-1667 Fort “Scharfeneck” and “Noli me tangere”, “Neue Ravelin” (today outside) and “Hohe-Ernst-Schanze”
  The monumental zone encompasses the fortifications including the mountain upon which they stand and which stretches spurlike towards the south to the town wall, whose remnants are included in the monumental zone. To this also belong the parade square, the so-called “White Villa” or “Rheinfels Estate”, built shortly before 1900 by the manufacturer Reusch; exposed location next to the Rheinfels ruin; plastered building with Gothic Revival elements, rusticated pedestal, gable risalto on the slope side, bay window on the valley side, lookout porch-balcony and tower (see also below)
- Evangelical Collegiate Church, Markt 3 – three-naved Late Gothic gallery hall church, eastern part on Romanesque crypt, Late Romanesque quire, towers flanking the quire, beginning of the tower expansion marked 1469; extensive reconstruction, 1889–1895, architect Heinrich Wiethase, Cologne (see also below)
- Saint Goar's and Saint Elizabeth's Catholic Parish Church (Pfarrkirche St. Goar und St. Elisabeth), Heerstraße 133 – Gothic Revival basilica, quarrystone, 1887–1891, architects Heinrich Wiethase and Eduard Endler, Cologne; in 1923 tower of the Baroque predecessor building incorporated as a belltower (see also below)
- Inner town (monumental zone) – The monumental zone ends in the north with the Catholic Church, there abuts on remnants of the town wall standing at the southwest facing the slope, which runs along to the modern bastion at the south end shortly before the tunnel, turns from there towards the northeast to the Rhine and ends at the no longer existing, but documented, town wall tower in the heights; on the Rhine the boundary runs along Bundesstraße 9 (side towards the mountains)
- Town wall – only the side towards the mountains preserved: northern stretch of wall 14th century with three-floor Kanzleiturm (“Chancellery Tower”) and three-floor Hexenturm (“Witches’ Tower”), ruin of the Taubenturm (“Doves’ Tower”, or perhaps “Dovecote”) in the southern half; Neuer Turm (“New Tower”) 17th century; Nappenturm, great three-floor blockhouse, southern stretch of wall with bastion called Pastete (“pie”), after 1736
- Am Hafen 2 – former Amt courthouse; three-floor plastered building, marked 1898
- Am Hafen 4/6 – Städtische Schule (“Municipal School”); Late Historicist building with hipped roof with corner risalti, partly slated, partly timber-frame, 1901
- Am Hafen 8 – representative Gothic Revival house, marked 1903
- Am Hafen 10 – plastered building on quarried-slate pedestal, about 1910; whole complex of buildings
- Bismarckweg 1–3 – former District Chairman's Office; Baroque Revival plastered building, 1914–1916, side wings 1928
- Grebelgasse 4 – three-floor timber-frame house, partly solid, plastered, hipped roof, marked 1780
- Gründelbach 4 – Haus Tusculum, representative house, partly ornamental timber framing, conservatory, 1900; whole complex of buildings with garden
- Heerstraße 5 – representative house, partly ornamental timber framing, marked 1892; garden
- Heerstraße 9 and 11 – timber-frame villa, Swiss style, marked 1879; whole complex of buildings with garden
- Heerstraße 13 – angled plastered building, about 1890
- Heerstraße 41, Oberstraße 81 – Loreleyhaus; timber-frame house, partly solid, plastered, 18th century
- Heerstraße 59 – plastered building, essentially from the late 18th century, shop front from the 1930s; timber-frame outbuilding in the back, plastered; in the back garden hoisting beams, quarrystone wall.
- Heerstraße 63 – Hotel “Silberne Rose”; three-floor timber-frame house, partly solid, 17th century
- Heerstraße 71 – “Rheinhotel”, formerly “Goldene Kette” inn; three-floor plastered building, marked 1789
- Heerstraße 81 – Kreissparkasse (“District Savings Bank”); thirteen-axis, three-floor plastered building, marked 1936
- Heerstraße 82 – Hotel “Zum goldenen Löwen”; three-floor timber-frame building, partly solid, plastered, marked 1782
- Heerstraße 101 – timber-frame house, partly solid, marked 1675, essentially possibly from the 16th century, wooden sculpture
- Heerstraße 105 – three-floor plastered building, early 19th century
- Heerstraße 123 – three-floor timber-frame house, partly solid, marked 1682, essentially older
- Heerstraße 130 – Town Hall; brick building with cross-shaped plan, mixed styles from Gothic Revival and Renaissance Revival, marked 1880
- Kirchplatz – hand pump, possibly from Rheinböllen Ironworks, latter half of the 19th century
- Inside Markt 1 – two-vaulted cellar, possibly mediaeval
- Markt 2 – former district electricity office; building with mansard roof, 1922
- Markt 4 – former Collegiate building, so-called monastery; fifteen-axis plastered building, essentially timber-frame, marked 1724, essentially older
- Opposite Oberstraße 3 – Hanbrunnen (well); well chamber inside quarried-slate wall, marked 1778
- Oberstraße 15 – nine-axis building with hipped roof, marked 1749
- Oberstraße 16 – three-floor representative building with hipped roof, mid 18th century, upper floor in the 19th century; whole complex of buildings with garden
- Oberstraße 19 – building with mansard roof, timber framing sided, late 18th century
- Oberstraße 20 – six-axis building with hipped mansard roof, marked 1764
- Oberstraße 27 – Haus Napp; building with mansard roof, timber framing plastered, marked 1780
- Oberstraße 32 – railway station; Expressionist quarrystone building, 1926–1928, goods clearing hall, 1909/1910; whole complex of buildings with underpass and track facilities
- Oberstraße 34 – “Hoffmanns Weinstube” (wine parlour); quarrystone building, 1929, with parts of the 17th-century predecessor building
- Oberstraße 38 – “Alte Weinstube zur Krone” (wine parlour); timber-frame building, partly solid, 18th century
- Oberstraße 39 – three-floor house, partly timber-frame, early 20th century
- Oberstraße 77 – Gothic Revival brick building, 1891
- Pumpengasse – two hand pumps, possibly from Rheinböllen Ironworks, latter half of the 19th century
- Schleiergasse 9 – timber-frame house, partly solid or slated, 18th century; whole complex of buildings with brick stable, about 1900
- Schlossberg/corner of Bismarckweg, graveyard – Böcking tomb
- Sonnengasse 6 – three-floor timber-frame house, plastered, marked 1779
- Sonnengasse 8 – two-floor timber-frame building, partly solid, plastered, building with mansard roof, marked 1750
- Winterhafen – diving bell “Kaiman” of the Rheinstrombauverwaltung (“Rhine Electrical Building Administration”), built in 1892, last of formerly two diving bell ships used between Cologne and Karlsruhe for underwater work on the riverbed

==== Biebernheim ====
- Evangelical church, Dorfstraße 8 – building with mansard roof with trapezoidal quire, 1702–1705, with parts of the predecessor building; whole complex of buildings with surrounding area
- An der Bach/corner of Linnenstraße – cast-iron hand pump, Rheinböllen Ironworks, latter half of the 19th century
- Auf der Schanz 2 – Late Classicist plastered building, latter half of the 19th century
- Dorfstraße 2 – timber-frame house, early 18th century
- Kuhweg – cast-iron hand pump, Rheinböllen Ironworks, latter half of the 19th century
- Linnengasse 52/54 – two-winged timber-frame building, hipped roof, 18th century

==== Fellen ====
- Prussian milestone, obelisk, about 1820/1825

==== Werlau ====
- Saint George’s Evangelical Church (St. Georgskirche), Kirchstraße – 1692-1698 new building an aisleless church, tower 1789–1791, prayer room 1892, conversion 1905, new construction of tower, 1906/1907
- Rheingoldstraße 52 – former rectory; Classicist building with hipped roof, sided (timber framing?), 1832/1833, building inspector F. Nebel, Koblenz
- Forsthaus Brandswald (forester's house), northwest of the village – one-floor quarrystone building, commercial wing, barn, bakehouse and well, early 19th century

=== More about buildings ===
The castle, Burg Rheinfels, stands – or rather lies in ruins – above Sankt Goar and was founded in 1245 by Count Diether of Katzenelnbogen. After it had been expanded into a fort, it was the biggest defensive complex in the Rhine Gorge and set the standard for castle building throughout the Empire. In the late 18th century, French Revolutionary troops destroyed the fort, after which the complex was used as a stone quarry for other building work. In 1843, Prince William of Prussia, later Kaiser Wilhelm I, acquired the ruin, thus preventing further destruction. Since 1925, the town of Sankt Goar has owned the castle. Today the complex houses a hotel operation and an inn. Also, it houses the town's local history museum.

The Evangelical Collegiate Church, consecrated to Saint Goar, in the centre of Sankt Goar is a church with Romanesque and Gothic features. The three-vaulted Romanesque crypt comes from the late 11th century. In the three-naved church up above are wall paintings from the latter half of the 15th century.

The Katholische Pfarrkirche zum Hl. Goar (Catholic Parish Church) was built in the late 19th century in the Gothic Revival style. Worth seeing are Saint Goar's Late Gothic tomb slab and a retable from 1480, which is among the most valuable works of Middle-Rhine painting.

=== Museums ===
The Deutsches Puppen- und Bärenmuseum (“German Doll and Bear Museum”) on Sonnengasse (lane) in Sankt Goar has since 1985 been giving visitors a review of the dolls, teddy bears and other toys from various generations. In an area of 600 m^{2}, more than 3,000 pieces from various collectors are exhibited. Moreover, the museum provides knowledge about dollmaking, doll tailoring and the work done in the museum's own doll and bear clinic.

The Wahrschauer- und Lotsenmuseum in Sankt Goar, dedicated to boat signalling and pilotage on the Middle Rhine, is found at a former pilotage and signalling station at the Bankeck at river kilometre 555.43. The museum collects and keeps extensive information about the history of shipping on the Rhine. Just outside the museum is an outdoor area where exhibits from the pilots’ and signalmen's daily life may be viewed. The museum is open from May to September.

At the local history museum at Burg Rheinfels are exhibits from the town's and the castle's history.

=== Regular events ===
- Easter Monday: Festival of the Flying Bridge
- First weekend in June: Castle Market and Knightly Tournament at Burg Rheinfels
- Third weekend in July: Marksmen's and Local History Festival
- Fourth weekend in July: Traditional Werlau Local History Festival in the outlying centre of Werlau.
- First weekend in August: Hansenfest
- Third weekend in August: St. Goar fire brigade promotional association's festival
- First weekend in September: Traditional Biewerumer Quetschekerb in the outlying centre of Biebernheim
- Third weekend in September: Rhein in Flammen fireworks from Burg Katz near Sankt Goarshausen, Burg Rheinfels near Sankt Goar and from the middle of the Rhine.

== Economy and infrastructure ==
The town's main industry is tourism. Other industries are winegrowing and agriculture.

=== Winegrowing ===
In 1240 the Counts of Katzenelnbogen owned a vineyard called Amererberge.

Sankt Goar's vineyards lie in the winemaking subregion of Rheinburgengau within the Middle Rhine wine region. The local winemaking appellation – Großlage – that belongs to this subregion comprises four smaller operations – Einzellagen – around Sankt Goar. Three of them, Rosenberg, Frohwingert and Ameisenberg, lie on the Gründelbach valley's steep slopes, while the fourth, Kuhstall, lies on the slope on the side of the Rhine Gorge opposite the Loreley. The vineyards are all steeply terraced and are planted mainly with Riesling.

=== Language ===
In German linguistics, the Sankt Goar Line is an isogloss separating dialects to the north from those to the south. See High German consonant shift.

=== Transport ===
==== Road ====
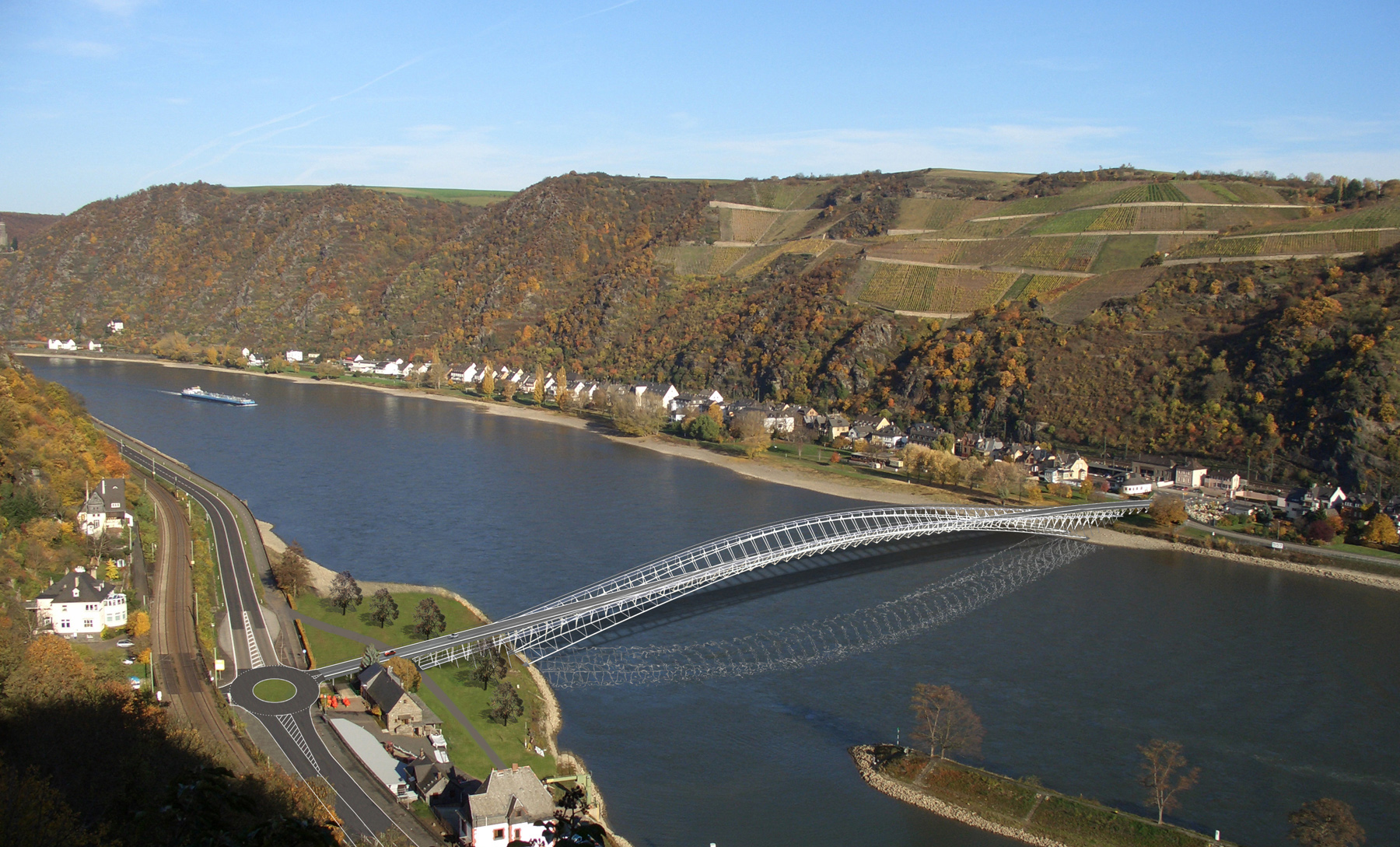
Photographic montage by an architecture student who submitted a study for a Middle Rhine bridge near Sankt Goar

Running through Sankt Goar (main centre) and the outlying centre of Fellen is Bundesstraße 9. Sankt Goar is linked to the Autobahn A 61 (Ludwigshafen-Mönchengladbach) by Landesstraße (State Road) 213, which leads to the Emmelshausen interchange (no. 42) 14 km away. For some years, planning has been under way for a Middle Rhine bridge between Sankt Goar and Sankt Goarshausen. It would be the first bridge across the Middle Rhine on the roughly 100-kilometre-long stretch between Koblenz and Wiesbaden.

==== Rail ====
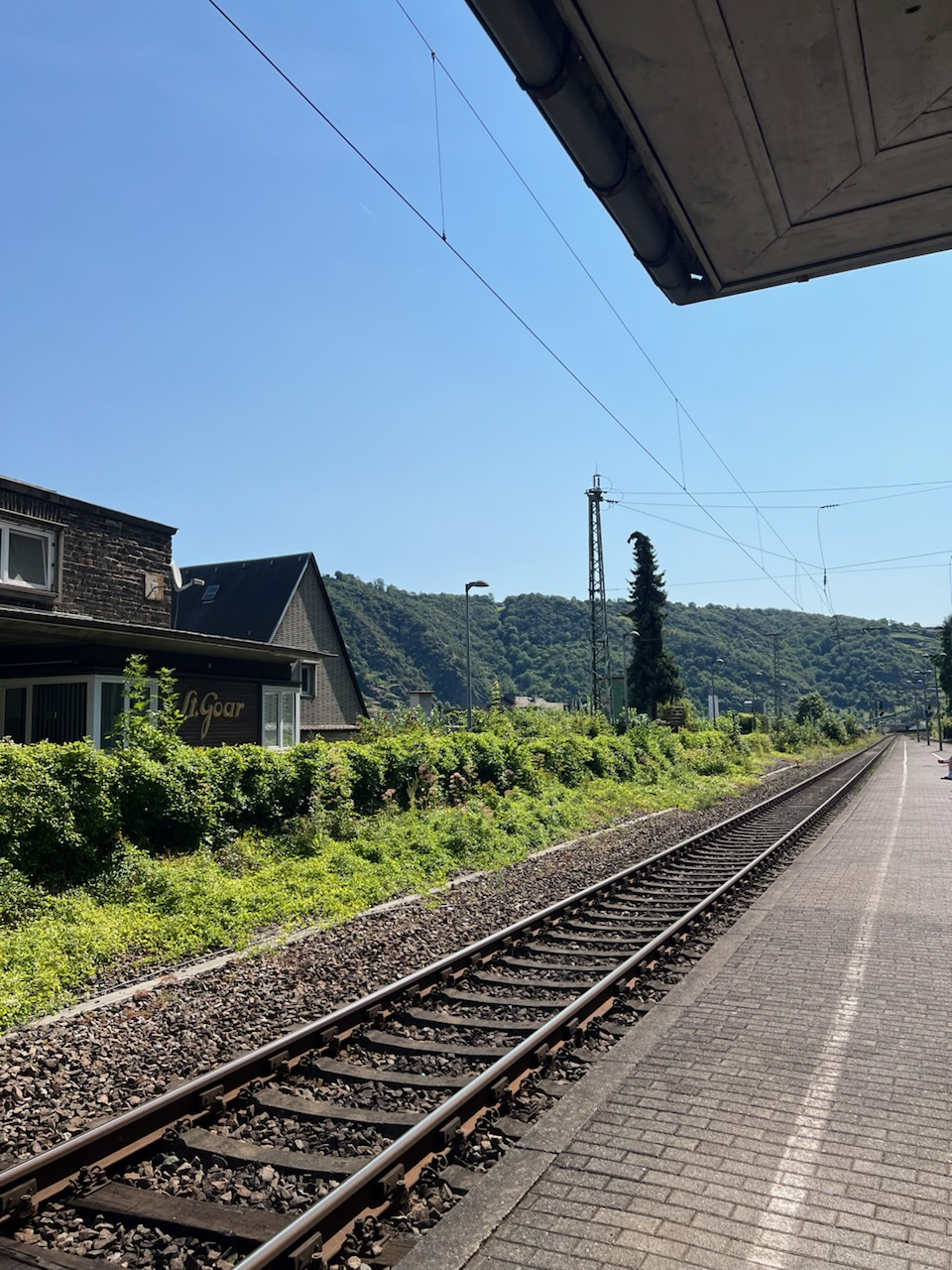
Sankt Goar railway station

The Sankt Goar railway station lies on the West Rhine Railway (Frankfurt – Mainz – Bingen – Koblenz – Cologne; DB route book no. 471) and is no longer staffed. Tickets can now only be bought from vending machines.

==== Ship ====
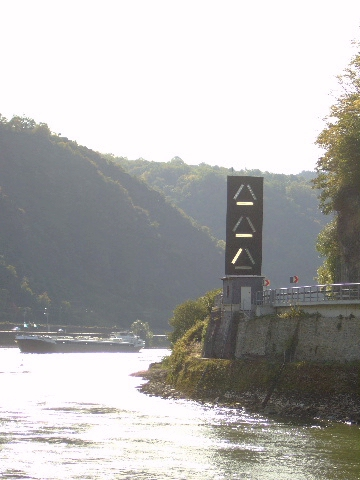
Signal standard on the Middle Rhine

Loreley ferry runs between Sankt Goar and Sankt Goarshausen

Sankt Goar has landing stages on the Rhine for various companies that run ships on the river, among them the Köln-Düsseldorfer line. The pedestrian and car ferry Loreley VI links Sankt Goar on the Rhine's left bank with its sister town Sankt Goarshausen over on the right bank. The town's harbour, “Rheinfelshafen”, lies right below the Burg Rheinfels ruin. Since 1994, the harbour has offered a marina for leisure craft of up to 15 m. Another harbour, for yachts, called “Hunt”, is found farther north in the outlying centre of Fellen.

=== Public institutions ===
Located in Sankt Goar is a court of first instance that has within its responsibilities the functions of Rheinschifffahrtsgericht (a court pertaining to matters involving shipping on the Rhine) and Moselschifffahrtsgericht (the same again, for the Moselle). In this capacity, the court is directly subordinate to the Rheinschifffahrtsobergericht Köln or Moselschifffahrtsobergericht Köln, as the case may be. These are both administered through the Higher Regional Court of Cologne. Sankt Goar is the seat of a Wasserschutzpolizei station, which is responsible for the stretch of river between Bacharach and Osterspai (river kilometres 544–575). Furthermore, there is a Sankt Goarshausen–Sankt Goar branch location of the financial office.

== Notable residents ==
=== Sons and daughters of the town ===
- Nikolaus Burgmann (1360–1443), cathedral deacon, professor at the University of Heidelberg, Faculty of Law
- Justin Göbler (1504–1567), jurist
- Philipp Peter Roos (Rosa di Tivoli, 1655–1706), German Baroque painter
- Diederich Thomas Fretz (1743–1815), merchant for the Dutch East India Company and commander of Galle Fort in Sri Lanka between 1792 and 1796
- Johann Samuel Eduard d'Alton (1803–1854), anatomist
- Adolf Friedrich Graf von Schack (1888–1945), Major, participant in the 20 July plot
- Friedrich Everling (1891–1958), lawyer, judge, politician and writer
- Richard Stöss (1944– ), German political scientist
- Eliezer ben Yaakov, also knowns as Zalman of St. Goar, a disciple of Maharil who published the latter's works

=== Famous people associated with the town ===
- Landgrave Ernst I of Hesse-Rheinfels-Rotenburg (1623–1693), chose Burg Rheinfels as his comital residence, had it expanded into a fort, and in 1649 moved in. He contributed considerably to Sankt Goar's economic growth in the wake of the Thirty Years' War.

== Sister Cities ==
- Siem Reap, Cambodia, since 13 May 2015
