= Gorr (surname) =

Gorr is a surname of German origin. Notable people with the surname include:

- Irina Gorr (born 1997), German athlete
- Libbi Gorr (born 1965), Australian TV and radio broadcaster
- Rita Gorr (1926–2012), Belgian operatic mezzo-soprano
- Shmuel Gorr (1931–1988), Israeli historian and genealogist

== See also ==
- Gor (disambiguation)
