= Deus-X =

1994 horror novel by American writer Joe Citro

- First edition cover
- Author: Joe Citro
- Language: English
- Publication date: 1994

Deus-X is a 1994 horror novel by American writer Joe Citro. The story ties together UFOs, government conspiracies, demonic possession, and Virgin Mary sightings, all with H. P. Lovecraft sensibilities. The book was re-released in 2003 by Hardscrabble Books under its full title of Deus-X: The Reality Conspiracy.

Of all his novels, Citro has repeatedly described Deux-X as being his darkest and most intricate. The idea for the book came from Citro's love for and fascination with the occult and paranormal. After researching and documenting countless ghost stories, UFO sightings, and general accounts of strange activity, Citro was struck by how interesting it would be if all these various phenomena were linked somehow. Further inspiration came from the Firesign Theatre album Everything You Know is Wrong. Citro found himself chilled by those words and sought to write a story which exposed everything we thought to be true as devious manipulations. The much-discussed ending is both shocking and darkly nihilistic.
