= Heist-op-den-Berg =

- Municipality
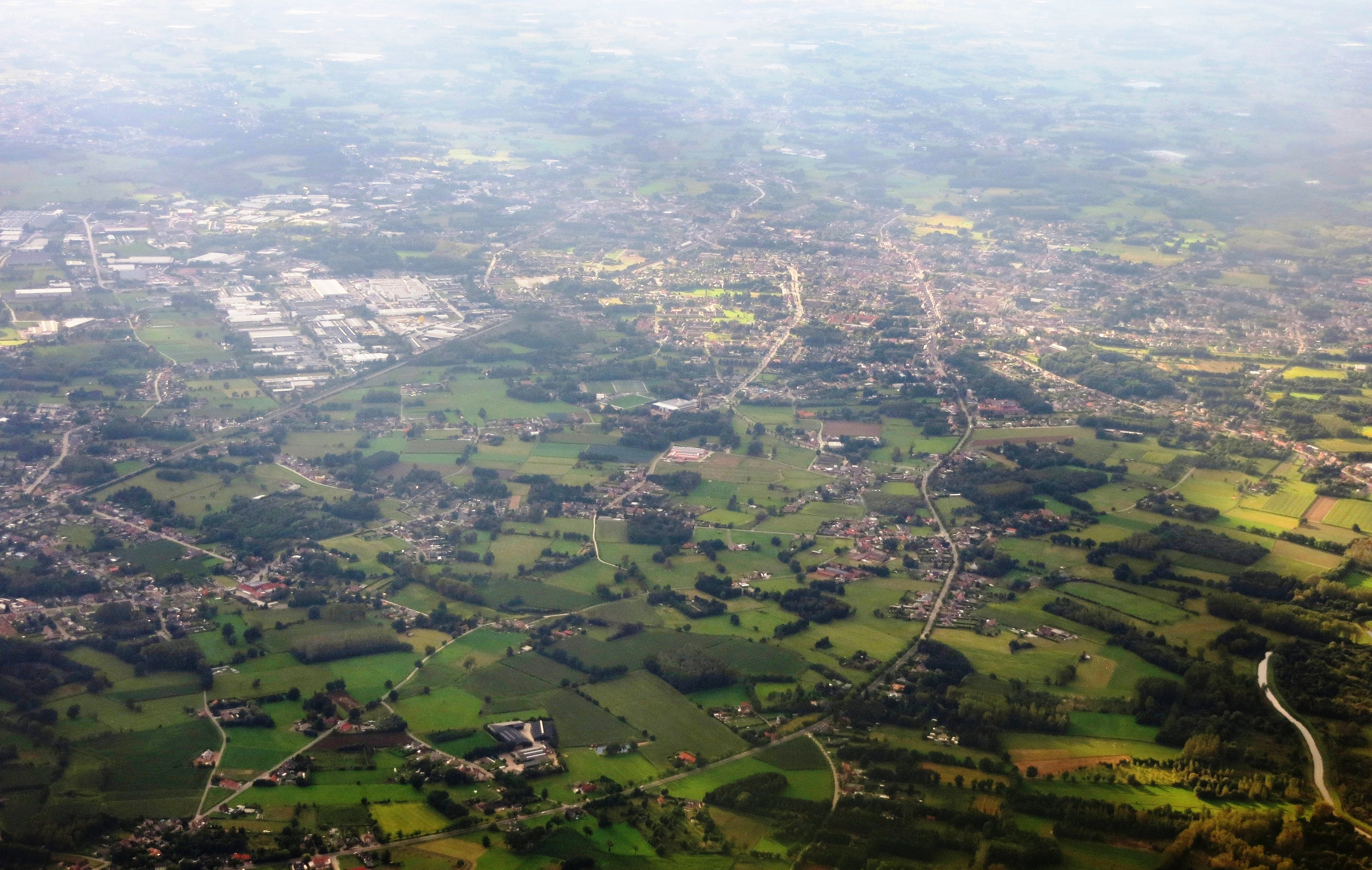

- Flag Coat of arms

- Location of Heist-op-den-Berg in the province of Antwerp
- Interactive map of Heist-op-den-Berg
- Location in Belgium
- Coordinates: 51°05′N 04°43′E
- Country: Belgium
- Community: Flemish Community
- Region: Flemish Region
- Province: Antwerp
- Arrondissement: Mechelen

Government
  - Mayor: Dirk Van Noten (CD&V)
  - Governing parties: CD&V, N-VA, PRO Heist, Open Vld, Groen

Area
  - Total: 86.67 km^{2} (33.46 sq mi)

Population (2020-01-01)
  - Total: 42,950
  - Density: 495.6/km^{2} (1,283/sq mi)
- Postal codes: 2220-2223
- NIS code: 12014
- Area codes: 015, 014, 016, 03
- Website: www.heist-op-den-berg.be

Heist-op-den-Berg (Dutch pronunciation: [ˌɦɛist ɔb də(m) ˈbɛr(ə)x]) is a municipality located in the Belgian province of Antwerp. The municipality comprises Heist-op-den-Berg proper (including the hamlets: Heist-Goor, Heist-Station, Zonderschot, Heist-Centrum and Bruggeneinde), the villages of Booischot (including the hamlet Pijpelheide), Hallaar, Itegem, Schriek and Wiekevorst.

== History ==
The 48-meter-high hill on which Heist would later be built (hence the adjunct name op-den-Berg meaning "on the hill") was formed during the early part of the Ice age. As can be appreciated from the artifacts shown at the regional museum on the town's main square, this area was already populated in prehistoric times. Soon after the Romans yielded this land to the invading Germanic peoples in the 3rd and 4th century, Christianization followed. The village of Itegem, located right on the Nete River, was most likely the first hamlet to be founded, as suggested by a document dating from 976. Chapels in Hallaar and Itegem were built in the 12th century. This century also marked the beginnings of the Duchy of Brabant, of which this whole area was a part.

Around the year 1200, a military fort was built at the current location of the Ter Laken castle, on Booischot's territory. Schriek, which was founded in 1125, got its own chapel in 1260 while the main church at Heist was built in 1340. These two religious buildings were heavily damaged during the wars of religion around 1600. During most of the Middle Ages, agriculture was driving the economy and several huge farming domains were built, some of which still subsist today (e.g., Wimpelhoeve in Wiekevorst, traces of which date from the 12th century, and Pandoerenhoeve in Schriek, dating from 1624). During the 17th and 18th century, the miraculous wooden statue of the Virgin and Child in the Hallaar church became an object of pilgrimage.

The current town hall was built in 1844, fourteen years after the foundation of Belgium as an independent country. Today, the town is mostly a residential centre, which offers services to the surrounding communities.

== Events ==
- Heistse Pijl, cycling race
- Heist-op-den-Berg is well known for its Sunday morning flea market.
- Hestival, every last saturday of August

== Sights ==
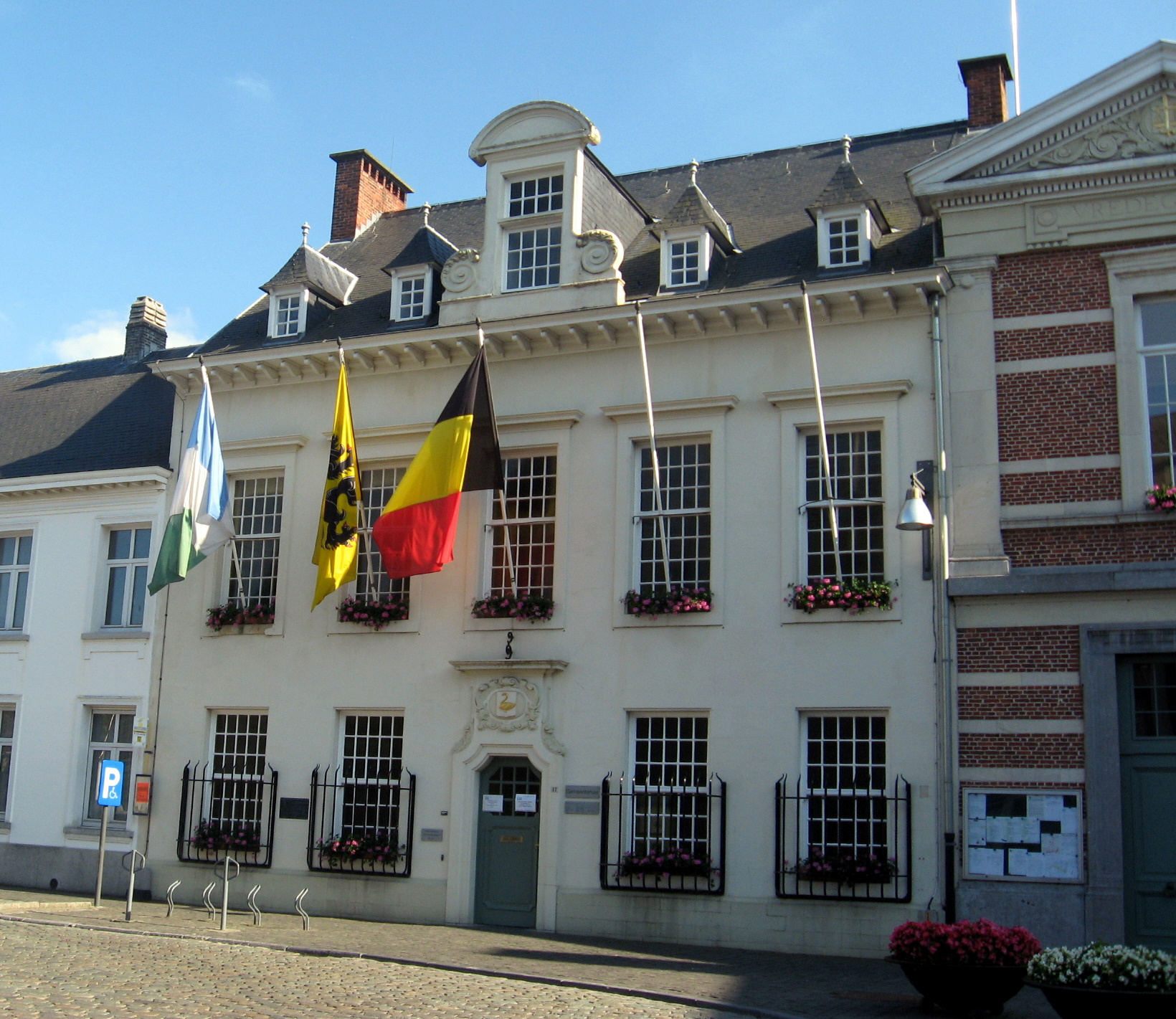
Heist-op-den-Berg town hall

- The historical heart of the town is the church square (Kerkplein), where one of the town's many old water pumps can be seen, and where a train museum (Treinmuseum) and a regional farming museum (Heemmuseum) can be visited.
- An old windmill, the last one in the Mechelen area, churches and chapels, and farms, many with their original water pumps, dot the landscape around the town.
- Heist-op-den-Berg (especially Itegem) also houses several castles, most of which are privately owned and therefore not open to the public.

== Notable residents ==
- Ivo van Hove, theatre director
- Rik Torfs, Rector of the Katholieke Universiteit Leuven
- Silvy De Bie, singer (b. 1981)
- Leo Laurens (born 1952), former professional darts player
- Paul Michiels, singer and songwriter (b. 1948)
- Filip Verlinden (born 1982), kickboxer
- Anak Verhoeven, (born 1996), rock climber

== Climate ==
Climate data for Heist-op-den-Berg (1991−2020 normals)
Month	Jan	Feb	Mar	Apr	May	Jun	Jul	Aug	Sep	Oct	Nov	Dec	Year
Mean daily maximum °C (°F)	6.7 (44.1)	7.7 (45.9)	11.5 (52.7)	15.8 (60.4)	19.4 (66.9)	22.1 (71.8)	24.1 (75.4)	23.9 (75.0)	20.4 (68.7)	15.6 (60.1)	10.5 (50.9)	7.1 (44.8)	15.4 (59.7)
Daily mean °C (°F)	4.0 (39.2)	4.4 (39.9)	7.2 (45.0)	10.4 (50.7)	14.2 (57.6)	17.1 (62.8)	19.1 (66.4)	18.7 (65.7)	15.4 (59.7)	11.5 (52.7)	7.4 (45.3)	4.5 (40.1)	11.2 (52.2)
Mean daily minimum °C (°F)	1.2 (34.2)	1.0 (33.8)	2.8 (37.0)	5.0 (41.0)	8.9 (48.0)	12.0 (53.6)	14.1 (57.4)	13.4 (56.1)	10.5 (50.9)	7.4 (45.3)	4.2 (39.6)	1.9 (35.4)	6.9 (44.4)
Average precipitation mm (inches)	71.8 (2.83)	64.1 (2.52)	57.2 (2.25)	44.2 (1.74)	58.2 (2.29)	74.2 (2.92)	78.7 (3.10)	81.4 (3.20)	68.5 (2.70)	66.3 (2.61)	76.0 (2.99)	88.4 (3.48)	828.9 (32.63)
Average precipitation days (≥ 1.0 mm)	12.9	11.6	11.0	9.0	9.7	10.1	10.7	10.6	9.9	11.0	12.6	14.1	133.2
Mean monthly sunshine hours	61	76	133	185	215	215	221	207	161	117	67	50	1,708
Source: Royal Meteorological Institute

== See also ==
- Heist-Goor
- K.S.K. Heist
