= Zalman of Sankt Goar =

15th-century Ashkenazi Jewish rabbi and chronicler

Zalman of Sankt Goar (or Salman of St. Goar; Eleazar ben Jacob) was a 15th-century Ashkenazi Jewish rabbi and chronicler from Sankt Goar in the Rhineland of Germany. A student and secretary of Yaqob ben Moses ha-Levi Molin, also known as Maharil, he was the author of the chronicle Gilgul bne Hushim (Course of the Events of the Sons of the Rushing), a Jewish perspective on the Hussite movement in Bohemia in the early 15th century, and Minhagei Maharil on the teachings of his mentor, which was published some time after his teacher's death. He wrote that he was a descendant of Asher ha-Levi and Isaac ben Eliezer Halevi. He was descended from a line of liturgical poets. He was the synagogue beadle in Mainz. Later on he may have moved to Italy.

His Gilgul reflects the Jewish collective memory of the Crusades, and focuses on the events of 1421 when threats to Jewish life took place amidst the battle of Žatec during the Hussite Wars. Zalman wrote that the Hussites attacked and burned churches, killing and torturing the clergy. Zalman started writing before 1427 and finished in 1454. The chronicle portrays Avigdor Kara preceding Jan Hus at the court of king Wenzel and includes popular lore and stories about Hus. It also covers events such as the burning of Hus in 1415, military advances in 1430 and the council at Basel in 1434.

The Sefer Maharil was the primary source consulted by Moses Isserles on the customs of Ashkenaz for his glosses on Shulchan Aruch. It covers ritual and holiday practices in an annual cycle format. It was printed in Sabbionetta in 1556, with many repeat printings due to its popularity, and a modern critical edition by Shlomo Spitzer in 1989.
