= The Vermont Ghost Guide =

The Vermont Ghost Guide is a comprehensive paranormal travel guide published in 2000 that documents all of the major hauntings and ghost-sightings in Vermont, inspired by the numerous Vermont wildlife and destination guides. The book was researched and written by Vermont folklore expert Joe Citro and illustrated by horror artist and fellow Vermonter Steve Bissette. The book is divided into sections, each devoted to a single region of Vermont and its supposed undead residents. Like his other non-fiction books, Citro does not speculate on whether or not the paranormal occurrences he describes are in fact true, but instead leaves that job entirely to the reader. However, as a joke, Citro did insert one account that was a complete fabrication, although he has never revealed which one that may be.
