= Heist-Goor =

- Village
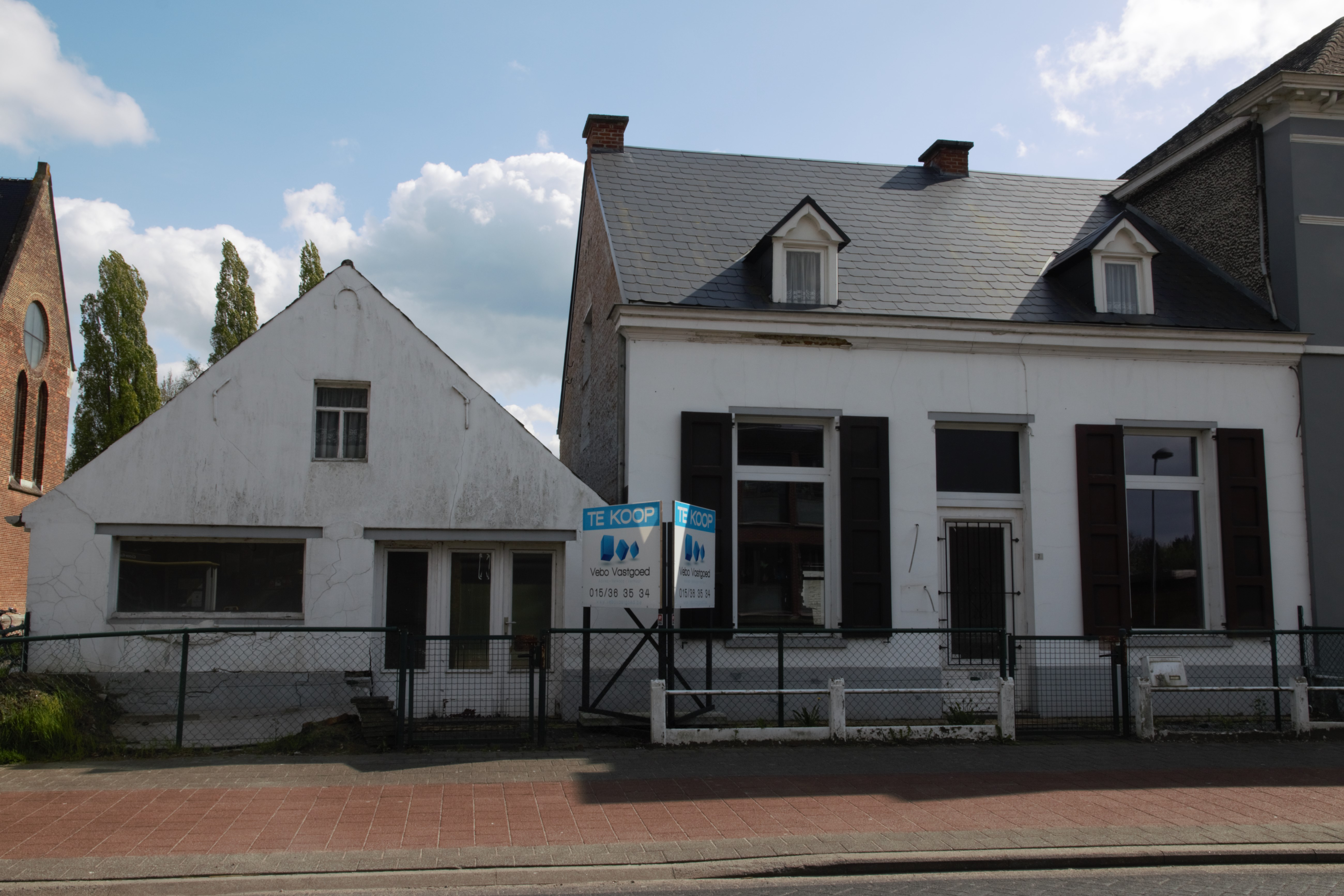
- Houses in Heist-Goor

- Location in Belgium
- Coordinates: 51.04564°N 4.72273°E
- Country: Belgium
- Region: Flemish Region
- Province: Antwerp
- Municipality: Heist-op-den-Berg

Area
  - Total: 7.78 km^{2} (3.00 sq mi)

Population (2021)
  - Total: 3,679
  - Density: 473/km^{2} (1,220/sq mi)
- Time zone: CET

Heist-Goor (Dutch pronunciation: [ɦɛistˈxoːr]; also Goor) is a village of Heist-op-den-Berg, that is situated in the south of the province of Antwerp (Flanders, Belgium). In the old days there was a swamp on this location (goor is an old Dutch word for swamp).

== Buildings in Heist-Goor ==
Heist-Goor has its own church, the Saint Alfons church. This church is situated in the center of the place, in the Pastoor Mellaertsstraat (which is the most important street of the hamlet). The church has two bells: the lighter Saint Alfons bell and the heavier Saint Franciscus bell. In the tower there is also a gsm-transmitter.

In the Pastoor-Mellaertsstraat there's also the primary school of Heist-Goor, the Gesubsidieerde Vrije Basisschool Heist-Goor. The hamlet has not got a secondary school. The secondary schools which are the closest bij Heist-Goor, the Heilig-Hartmiddenschool and Atheneum Hof van Riemen, are in the hamlets Heist-Station and Heist-Centrum.

Also the local parish hall is in this Pastoor Mellaertsstraat.

In Heist-Goor there's an old building called 'The Mollehoef', it was built in 1728, and therefore it is the oldest building of the hamlet. The street in which it is built was later called 'Mollehoefweg' (Mollehoef road).

== Clubs in Heist-Goor ==
- Music school
- Local library
- Local marching band: de Goorse Bloesem
- Amateur theater society: de Goorse Molenwiek
