= HNoMS Gor =

Two ships of the Royal Norwegian Navy have borne the name HNoMS Gor, after Gór – the mythological co-founder of Norway:

- HNoMS Gor (1884) was a Gor-class Rendel gunboat. She was launched in 1884, captured by the Germans in 1940, returned to Norway in 1945 and scrapped shortly thereafter.
- HNoMS Gor (N48) was the ex-American Auk-class minesweeper USS Strive (AM-117). She was launched on 16 May 1942, transferred to the Royal Norwegian Navy on 1 October 1959, and decommissioned in 1976.
