= Gór, Hungary =

Gór
- Flag Coat of arms

- Location of Vas county in Hungary

- Location of Gór, Hungary
- Coordinates: 47.35799°N 16.80271°E
- Country: Hungary
- County: Vas

Area
  - Total: 10.99 km^{2} (4.24 sq mi)

Population (2004)
  - Total: 252
  - Density: 22.92/km^{2} (59.4/sq mi)
- Time zone: UTC+1 (CET)
  - Summer (DST): UTC+2 (CEST)
- Postal code: 9625
- Area code: 94

Gór is a village in Vas county, Hungary.
