= Gennady Gor =

Soviet science fiction writer

Gennady Samoilovich Gor (Russian: Генна́дий Само́йлович Гор) (January 15, 1907 in Verkhneudinsk, Siberia - January 6, 1981 in St. Petersburg) was a Soviet writer of science fiction.

The son of a Jewish family exiled to Siberia, Gor went in 1923 to Petrograd, where he studied history and philology and survived the Siege of Leningrad. Here he took up with representatives of the avant-garde literature of the time, including Daniil Kharms and Alexander Vvedensky, the heads of the avant-garde group OBERIU. As early as 1925 he began to publish, in addition to popular science texts about the life and culture of northern Siberian tribes, his first experimental literature (first short story collection, 1933). From 1961 he also wrote science fiction and published in this field numerous novels, short stories and novellas. In the GDR he published some stories (which appeared in anthologies) and translated two novels. His poems appeared in 2007.
