= Jim Goar =

American contemporary poet (born 1975)

Jim W. Goar (born 1975) is an American contemporary poet.

== Biography ==
Goar was born in San Francisco and educated at Naropa University, where he received a Master of Fine Arts degree, and the University of East Anglia, where he received a PhD. In 2006, effing press made his chapbook, Whole Milk. Of this collection Scott Glassman at Rain Taxi stated that Goar's "clause-free declarative sentences are a perfect match for the edgy grade-school surrealism which guides us into emotional revelation.” Jordan Davis, in his Constant Critic article, included it amongst his best texts of the year. Seoul Bus Poems (2010), his first full-length collection, was published by Ken Edwards' Reality Street. This collection was hailed as a "brilliant portrait of life in a foreign city" and "a glorious example of sparse language and observations." Positive reviews have also appeared in Intercapillary Space and etcetera. Rose Metal Press published his second collection, The Louisiana Purchase in November 2011. Scott Abels listed The Louisiana Purchase as a 'Best Poetry Book of 2011' at No Tell Motel. Since 2006, Goar's poetry has appeared in magazines including Poetry Wales, Blackbox Manifold, Typo, Jacket, Octopus, Harvard Review, OmniVerse, Cream City Review, and Cimarron Review. He's been invited to read his poetry at the SoundEye Festival in Cork Ireland and at Pembroke College, Cambridge. past simple, the journal he edits, has had poems featured in the anthology: Best of the Net 2007 and is currently in its 10th issue.

== Bibliography ==
- Whole Milk (Effing Press, 2006)
- Seoul Bus Poems (Reality Street, 2010)
- The Louisiana Purchase (Rose Metal Press, 2011)
- The Dustbowl (Shearsman Books, 2014)

== Anthologies ==
- The Bedside Guide to No Tell Motel (No Tell Books, 2006)
- Dear World & Everyone In It: new poetry in the UK (Bloodaxe Books, 2013)
