= Gore (given name) =

Gore is a given name. It may refer to:

- Gore Browne (c.1764–1843), British Army officer and politician
- Gore Ouseley (1770–1844), British baron, entrepreneur, linguist, and diplomat
- Gore Verbinski (born 1964), American film director, screenwriter, producer, and musician
- Gore Vidal (1925–2012), American writer, politician, and public intellectual

== See also ==
- Richard Corben (pen-name: Gore; 1940–2020), American illustrator and comic book artist
