= The Unseen (novel) =

1990 horror mystery novel by Joseph A. Citro

- Author: Joseph A. Citro
- Language: English
- Publication date: 1990

The Unseen is a 1990 horror/mystery novel by Vermont author Joseph A. Citro that follows mysterious events in the middle of the wilderness of Vermont's Northeast Kingdom. A former journalist becomes curious when an area man kills himself after witnessing something horrific in the wilderness. The journalist, his friend and his girlfriend's son try to unravel the mystery. The book references several real New England folktales and occult events, including sasquatch legends and a doomed hotel. The book was to be titled "The Gore," referring to the peculiar areas of no man's land that dot Vermont. Citro was not fond of the forced name-change, fearing the novel would become like its namesake and barely be read. His prediction proved correct, and the novel was not successful. In 2000, it was re-released under its original title by Hardscrabble Books and had greater success. It was later redistributed by DS Publishing of Anchorage, Alaska.
