= Joseph Citro =

American novelist

Joseph A. Citro is a Vermont author and folklorist who has extensively researched and documented the folklore, hauntings, ghost stories, paranormal activity and occult happenings of New England.

== Early life and education ==
A lifelong Vermonter. Citro was born in Rutland, grew up in Chester, lived in Underhill, and now resides in Windsor. His father was a machinist and storyteller, telling tales of the people and natural world of Vermont, and his mother encouraged his love of reading.

As a child he wrote short stories and comic books. He graduated from Keene State College with a BA in English in 1971. He worked for the state's Department of Education and the Department of Human Service until 1983 designing vocational educational programs for people with developmental disabilities.

== Career ==
Interested in horror since he was a child, especially the works of Edgar Allan Poe and H. P. Lovecraft, Citro began his writing career by authoring several horror novels, including Shadow Child, The Unseen, and Guardian Angels. These novels blended the gothic elements of Poe and the eldritch terror of Lovecraft with actual Vermont folklore and contemporary New England settings. Citro has sold the film options for Shadow Child five times, including once to Miramax.

Citro collects eccentric legends, folk tales, mysterious monsters, UFO sightings, haunted houses, and general uncanny activity of New England. This became the basis for his books Weird New England and The Vermont Monster Guide.

If ghosts are the spirits of the dead, no, I don't believe.... If ghosts are some sort of spiritual phenomenon that we don't have a better explanation for, then, yes, I do believe... [B]ut I don't know what they are.

He has given many seminars about writing horror and non-fiction, and gave commentaries on Vermont Public Radio from 1990 to 2010. He has done public speaking in prisons and to students who are reluctant readers. He has taught at the Bread Loaf Writer's Conference. His works Guardian Angels, The Unseen and Lake Monsters have been released in Polish, following the publishing boom for horror novels in Poland, after the revolutions of 1989. Lake Monsters has also been released in French.

== Novels ==
- Shadow Child (1987)
- Guardian Angels (1988)
- The Unseen (1990)
- Lake Monsters (1991)
- Deus-X (1994)

== Non-fiction ==
- Green Mountain Ghosts, Ghouls and Unsolved Mysteries (1994)
- Passing Strange: True Tales of New England Hauntings and Horrors (1996)
- Green Mountains, Dark Tales (1999)
- The Vermont Ghost Guide (2000)
- Vermont Air: The Best of the Vermont Public Radio Commentary Series (2002) (with Philip Baruth)
- Curious New England: The Unconventional Traveler's Guide to Eccentric Destinations (2003) (with Diane E. Foulds)
- Cursed in New England: Stories of Damned Yankees (2004)
- Weird New England (2006) (with a foreword by Mark Sceurman and Mark Moran)
- The Vermont Monster Guide (2009)
