= Gore, Ohio =

Unincorporated community in Ohio, U.S.

Coordinates: 39°34′49″N 82°17′42″W

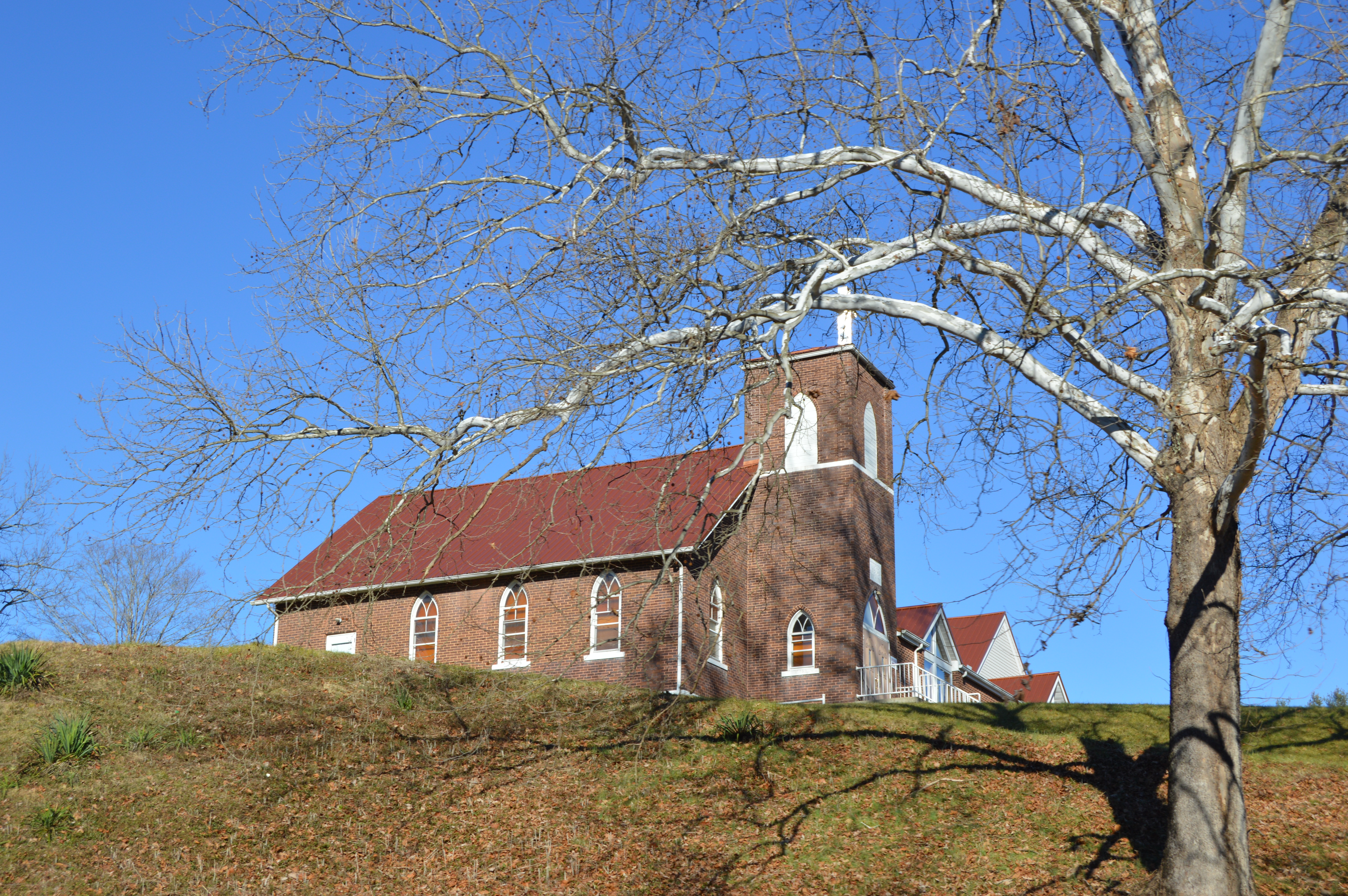
Methodist church

Gore is an unincorporated community in Hocking County, in the U.S. state of Ohio.

== History ==
Old variant names of Gore include Hamlin, New Gore and Burgessville. Burgessville was first to be laid out, in January 1871. Hamlin was laid out in February 1871. These nearby rival towns, separated only by railroad tracks, eventually merged. The community is said to derive its name from the dressmaking term "gore".
