= Yaakov ben Moshe Levi Moelin =

German rabbi

Rabbi Yaakov ben Moshe Levi Moelin
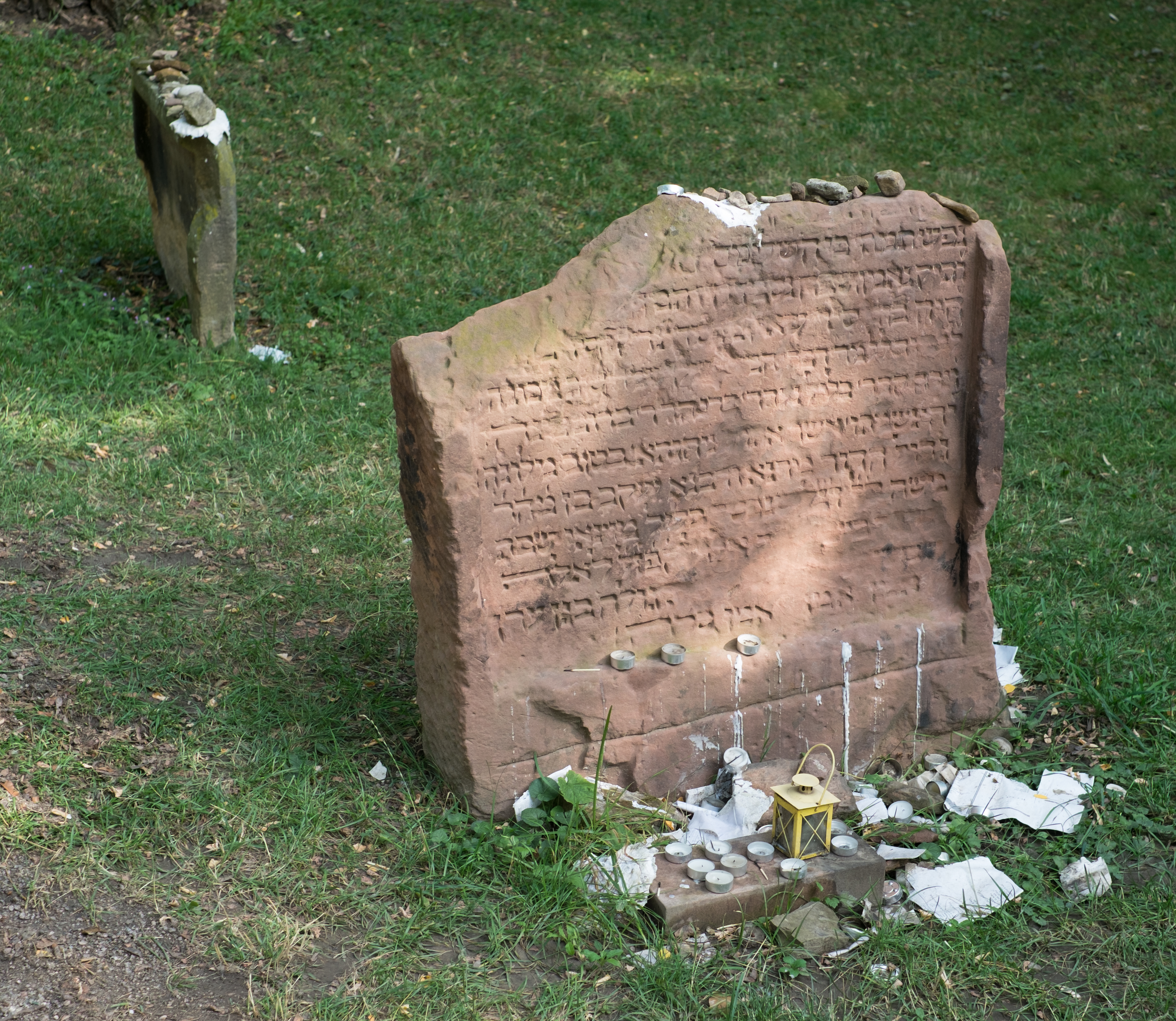
- Grave of Yaakov ben Moshe Levi Moelin in Worms, Germany
- Title: Maharil

Personal life
- Born: c. 1365 Mainz, Holy Roman Empire
- Died: September 14, 1427 Worms, Holy Roman Empire
- Buried: Jewish Cemetery, Worms
- Parent: Rabbi Moshe Levi Moelin

Religious life
- Religion: Judaism
- Profession: Rabbi of Mainz

Yaakov ben Moshe Levi Moelin (Hebrew: יעקב בן משה מולין) (c. 1365 – September 14, 1427) was a Talmudist and posek (authority on Jewish law) best known for his codification of the customs (minhagim) of the German Jews. He is also known as Maharil (Hebrew: מהריל) - the Hebrew acronym for "Our Teacher, the Rabbi, Yaakov Levi" - as well as Mahari Segal or Mahari Moelin. Maharil's Minhagim was a source of law for Moses Isserles’ component of the Shulkhan Arukh.

== Biography ==
Maharil was the son and pupil of Moshe Levi Moelin, Rabbi of Mainz, and a pupil of R. Shalom b. Isaac (he) of Wiener Neustadt. At a young age, Moelin was recognized as a budding scholar. In 1387, he succeeded his father as Rabbi of Mainz. He established a yeshiva in Mainz which attracted many students. One of his most noteworthy students was Jacob Weil. Moelin lived through the mass slaughter of Jews in Austria in 1420 and the Hussite Wars in 1421, which brought suffering to the Jews of Bavaria and the Rhine; see History of the Jews in Germany. Maharil played an important role in rebuilding these communities. He died in September 14, 1427 and was buried in the Jewish Cemetery of Worms.

Moelin composed piyyutim for the synagogue. He was also a notable Hazzan who famously ruled that traditional melodies should not be changed. Some traditional melodies attributed to him were still in use in pre-World War II Mainz. He appears also to have been familiar with the study of astronomy.

== Works ==
Maharil's best known work is Minhagei Maharil, also known as Sefer ha-Maharil or simply the Minhagim (customs). It contains a detailed description of religious observances and rites, at home and in the synagogue, and thus provides an authoritative outline of the minhagim of the German Jews. It also contains sermons and textual comments. It was compiled by Moelin's student, Zalman of St. Goar, and was first published - with various additions - at Sabbioneta, in 1556 and frequently thereafter. It had a great influence on the Jews of Central Europe and was largely responsible for the importance attached to minhag in these communities. This book is frequently quoted in the codes and commentaries - including Moshe Isserles who cites Maharil frequently in the Shulkhan Arukh - and has become a valuable source for later scholars (Achronim).

Another pupil of Moelin, Eleazer b. Jacob, collected some of Moelin's responsa; these were published in Venice in 1549. Many more of Moelin's responsa remained in manuscript. These were collected and edited by Rabbi Yitzhak Satz, and, published in 1977 under the title SHuT Maharil heChadashot ("New Responsa of Yaakov Molin").

Recently, the German esoteric scholar Georg Dehn has argued that the MaHaRIL was also the author of The Book of Abramelin, which he wrote under the pseudonym of Abraham von Worms. However, this is disputed.

=== Text of Minhagei Maharil ===
Unlike traditional books, the text of Minhagei Maharil was never fixed. In his critical edition of Minhagei Maharil, Shlomo Shpitzer surveyed 22 manuscripts of the work and noted that "The only thing common between them was that no one text was like the other." As such, there is great importance to every early version of the work. In 1989, Machon Yerushalayim published a critical edition of the work, edited by Shlomo Shpitzer. In 2024, Wieder Press published a facsimile edition of the RSL Ginzburg 979 manuscript which wasn't available to Shpitzer when he did his work.
