= Goar of Aquitaine =

French priest and hermit (c. 585–649)

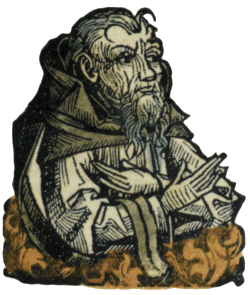
- Saint Goar from the Nuremberg Chronicle (c. 1493)

Priest and Hermit
- Born: c. 585; Aquitaine, Francia
- Died: 6 July 649 (aged 63–64); Oberwesel, Austrasia
- Venerated in: Roman Catholic Church; Eastern Orthodox Church
- Feast: 6 July
- Attributes: Hermit being given milk by three hinds; holding a pitcher; with the devil on his shoulder or under his feet; holding the church of Saint Goar am Rhein; hanging his hat on a sunbeam
- Patronage: Innkeepers, potters, and vine growers

Saint Goar of Aquitaine (Latin: Goaris; c. 585 – 6 July 649 AD) was a French priest and hermit of the seventh century. He was offered the position of Bishop of Trier, but prayed to be excused from the position. Goar is noted for his piety and is revered as a miracle-worker. He is a patron saint of innkeepers, potters, and vine growers.

== Life ==
Goar was born in 585 to a noble family in Aquitaine, and was noted for piety even in his youth. When he was finally ordained a priest, he became famous for his forceful preaching. However, Goar wanted to serve God more discreetly, and so traveled abroad to the diocese of Trier in 618 to become a hermit near the town of Oberwesel. Despite his intention to live in solitude and obscurity, his renown for holiness spread all over the country.

Goar was frequently visited by travelers seeking advice. On one occasion, he was derided by two pilgrims, who told Rusticus, the Bishop of Trier, that the hermit was a hypocrite and did not live true to his vows of poverty and chastity. Goar was called upon by the bishop to defend himself. When Goar appeared to argue his case before Rusticus, legend says that he effected a decisive miracle, by which the hermit proved his innocence; even more, the miracle indicated that Rusticus was guilty of the very same charges of imprudence and lasciviousness. As a result, Sigebert III, King of Austrasia, called Goar to Metz and requested that he fill Rusticus's position in Trier.

Another version of the story states that Goar was accused of sorcery by Rusticus himself, cleared by Sigebert in Metz, and then, after Rusticus was deposed for his dishonesty, the saint was offered the see of Trier.

In any case, it is certain that Goar did not want to saddle himself with the responsibilities and pressures of a bishopric, and asked for time to reflect on the offer. Upon returning to Oberwesel, however, he fell ill and died on 6 July 649, having never become bishop.

== Veneration ==
The Catholic Encyclopedia notes that "a small church" was dedicated to Goar in 1768 "in the little town on the banks of the Rhine which bears his name (St-Goar)." It is also reported that Charlemagne built a church over the site of Goar's hermitage. It is around this church that the town of Sankt Goar am Rhein grew on the left bank of the Rhine between Wesel and Boppard.

A life of Saint Goar (Vita Sancti Goaris) was written in 839 by a monk, Wandalbert of Prüm. This semi-legendary account of Goar's life details various miracles relevant to the life of the saint. The first was the one by which Goar proved Rusticus's unsavory nature. A foundling, recovered in a nearby church, was brought to the saint. The bishop called upon Goar to name the father of the baby as a proof of his innocence. Goar did not fail the test; he named the bishop Rusticus his father, upon which Rusticus was shocked and begged for forgiveness.

Another miracle explains Goar's depiction as hanging his hat on a sunbeam. When the saint refused Sigebert's invitation to the See of Trier, he threw his cappa over a sunbeam: the garment was suspended "as though the shaft of light were solid." The purpose of this miracle was not merely a display of bravado, but to show that the saint's action in refusing the position was divinely justified.

Goar's feast day is 6 July. He is variously depicted in art as a hermit being given milk by three hinds, as holding a pitcher, with the devil on his shoulder or under his feet, and as holding the church of Saint Goar am Rhein.

== See also ==
- Sankt Goar am Rhein
- Sankt Goarshausen
