= Goring (surname) =

Goring is an English surname (not to be confused with the German surname Göring). Notable people with this surname include the following:

- Goring baronets, a noble family in the baronetage of England
- Alison Goring (born 1963), Canadian curler
- Butch Goring (born 1949), retired Canadian hockey player
- Charles Goring, 2nd Earl of Norwich (1615–1671)
- Charles Buckman Goring (1870–1919), English criminologist
- George Goring, 1st Earl of Norwich (1585–1663)
- George Goring, Lord Goring (1608–1657), English Civil War general
- Henry Goring and Harry Goring, several people
- Marius Goring (1912–1998), English actor
- Peter Goring (1927–1994), English footballer
- Trevor Goring (born 1949), English visual artist
- Trevor Goring (comics), English comic book and storyboard artist
- William Goring (disambiguation), several people

== See also ==
- Arthur Goring Thomas, English composer
