= Goering (disambiguation) =

Hermann Goering was a German political and military leader and convicted war criminal.

It can also refer to:

- Anton Goering, a German naturalist, painter and graphic artist who spent several years in Venezuela.
- Carl Goering (ger. Carl Göring), a 19th century German academic, philosopher and chess master.
- Fritz Von Goering, a 20th century American professional wrestler.
- Reinhard Goering, a 19th century German playwright.
- Tanja Goering, American politician
- Werner Goering, an American bomber pilot who believed himself to be the nephew of the aforementioned Hermann Goering

== Other uses ==
- Goering Ranches Airport, a private airport in Oregon, USA
- Hermann Goering Division, a German Air Force armoured division of the Second World War.
- Goering's bread basket, a German incendiary device used during the Bristol Blitz
- Goering's Green Folder, a document presented by Hermann Goering during the Nuremberg trial

== See also ==
- Göring (disambiguation)
- Goring (disambiguation)
