= Goring =

Goring may refer to:

== Places in England ==
- Goring Gap, geological feature on the River Thames near Reading, England
- Goring Heath, village and parish, Oxfordshire
- Goring-on-Thames, village and parish, Oxfordshire
- Goring Lock, a lock and weir on the River Thames in Oxfordshire, England
- Goring-by-Sea, West Sussex, a suburb of Worthing
- Goring (electoral division), an electoral division in West Sussex which contains Goring-by-Sea

== Other uses ==
- Goring, an injury caused by an animal horn or tusk, an especial hazard in bullfighting
- Goring (surname)
- Göring Gambit, a chess opening
- Goring Hotel, 5-star hotel in London
- Lord Goring, a fictional character in Oscar Wilde's 1895 play An Ideal Husband
- Typhoon Goring, several tropical cyclones of the same name

== See also ==
- Göring (disambiguation)
- Gore (disambiguation)
