= Göring (disambiguation) =

Hermann Göring (1893–1946) was a leading member of the Nazi Party.

Göring may also refer to:

- Göring (surname)
- Fallschirm-Panzergrenadier Division 2 Hermann Göring, a division formed in the area of Radom
- Fallschirm-Panzer Division 1 Hermann Göring, a Luftwaffe armoured division

== See also ==
- Goering (disambiguation)
- Goring (disambiguation)
- Carl Göring, a 19th century German academic, philosopher and chess master
  - Göring Attack, a chess line in the Evans Gambit
  - Göring Gambit, a chess line in the Scotch Game
  - Göring Variant, a chess line in the Two Knights Game
