= Sydney Jordan =

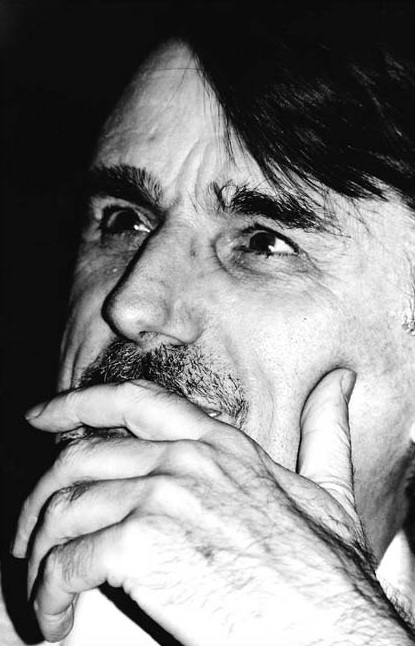
Sydney Jordan in 1994

Sydney Jordan (born Dundee, Scotland, 1928) is a comics artist best known for his daily science fiction strip Jeff Hawke, which ran in the Daily Express from 1955 to 1974.

== Career ==
He studied aeronautical engineering at Miles Aircraft's experimental college in Reading, Berkshire, but returned to Dundee and worked as an assistant to comics artist Bill McCail, and learned by studying the work of Alex Raymond, Milton Caniff and Stan Drake. In 1951 he assisted Len Fullerton on his comic strip Dora, Toni and Liz, before creating Jeff Hawke for the Daily Express in 1954. Jordan's friend Willie Patterson came aboard as writer in 1956, and Jordan wrote the later strips himself. The series has been reprinted all over Europe.

== Later work ==
After Jeff Hawke finished, Jordan created another science fiction strip, Lance McLane, which ran in the Scottish newspaper the Daily Record from 1976 to 1988.

In the mid seventies Jordan produced the one shot "Hall Star" for the Dutch comic strip weekly Eppo, which he did not complete until the mid eighties. It was published in 1987 and 1988 as Stranded on Thyton.

== Assistance ==
Another artist and close friend of Sydney Jordan, Nick Faure (born in 1944) worked alongside the master, and aside from drawing his own commissions from the newspapers in Fleet Street, he helped as an inker to draw some the "likenesses" and realistic "ladies" in the stories at the latter period of the strips existence as Sydney was always the master of effects. Thanks to Sydney's connections at Porsche Cars GB, Nick went on to become a well known Racecar driver for Porsche in the UK and achieved his own success as "Mr. Porsche" with a career which included 11 participations in the legendary 24 Hours of Le Mans.

Also assisting Jordan at times were up and coming artists Paul Neary, Brian Bolland and Trevor Goring.
