= Jeff Hawke =

British comic strip by Sydney Jordan

- Jeff Hawke
- Author: Sydney Jordan
- Current status/schedule: Finished
- Launch date: 15 February 1955
- End date: 18 April 1974
- Publisher: Daily Express
- Genre: Science fiction

Jeff Hawke was a British science fiction comic strip created by Sydney Jordan. It was published in the Daily Express from 15 February 1954 to 18 April 1974, by which point Jordan had "written or co-written and drawn 6,474 episodes." Despite its obscurity in English-speaking countries, it is often regarded as one of the most important science fiction comics ever released, especially in Italy and Scandinavian countries.

== Publication history ==
Sydney Jordan was a graduate of the Aeronautical Technical School in Reading. He long sought to draw a fantastic comic where he could exploit his skills in drawing aeroplanes. In 1955 he met Eric Souster and Jim Gilbert in London, two friends with whom he had served in the R.A.F. Together they created the character of Jeff Hawke.

At first Jeff Hawke, presented as an ex-R.A.F. pilot (just like Jordan) was a rather ordinary, Flash Gordon-like heroic character. The plots were centred on ordinary adventure and science fiction themes common in pulp comics and fiction of the age, and at this stage the drawings were only of average quality. Nevertheless, the strip was good enough to be published daily in the Daily Express.

In 1956 William Patterson joined his childhood friend Jordan, at first writing only the dialogue. Prior to this he did work on the Children's Encyclopedia for Amalgamated Press, also doing stories for Dan Dare and war comics. However, after a few years he began to produce plot lines and stories as well. This led to a dramatic improvement in the quality of the comic. Patterson made Jeff Hawke the first science fiction comic strip for adults, not just children or adolescents. Jordan, now concentrating entirely on drawing, improved his style to a highly suggestive, realistic, contrasted black-and-white mark. The Patterson-Jordan period is considered the "true" Jeff Hawke by most.

There was also a Jeff Hawke series published drawn by Ferdinando Tacconi and published in the "Junior Express" comic book, aimed at children.

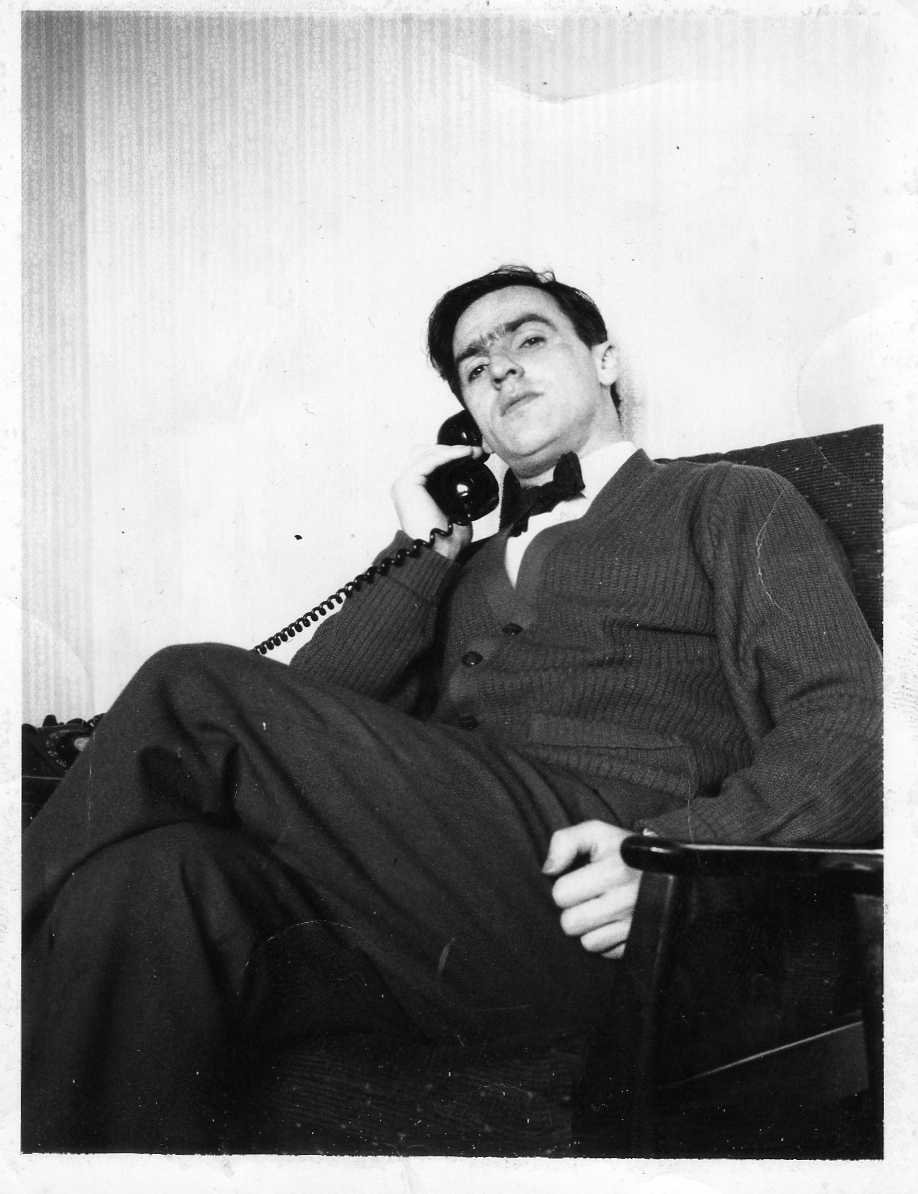
William Patterson, writer of Jeff Hawke

In 1969, following a number of stresses and pressures, William Patterson's contract to write Jeff Hawke came to an end. He was not in good mental health and remained in London, separated from his family who stayed in Perth. Willie Patterson's physical health was also affected and he died in 1986, aged only 57 years old. He was laid to rest in Kensal Green cemetery, attended by his daughters Chrys Muirhead and Frances Patterson, and Sydney Jordan. The 1986 Titan Books republication of Jeff Hawke, Book Two, contains a testimonial to the life of Willie Patterson, by Sydney Jordan.

Jordan took back care of both stories and drawings, but without Patterson the quality of the strip declined again. Finally, on 18 April 1974 the Daily Express published its last Jeff Hawke strip.

In 1977, however, comics artist Brian Bolland was approached by Jordan to ghost some episodes, and remarked that by this point fellow artist - "active in the days of comic fandom" and soon to turn professional - Paul Neary had "already done quite a few." Bolland drew 15 episodes, and "Syd touched up some of the faces, a few details here and there, to make them look a bit more like him." By this point, "although the Express owned the rights to the strip, they were not printing it," but since it had a strong European following, these new episodes (Bolland believes) "got collected in anthologies in French and Spanish," but not in the UK except briefly in "the fanzine Eureka."

=== Lance McLane ===
Jordan later tried to revamp the character by publishing a similar strip called Lance McLane in the Scottish newspaper Daily Record. After this failed to catch on, Jordan came up with a plot device in which McLane transformed himself into Hawke. However the resuscitated strip never recovered the original brilliance of the Patterson period: Jordan left more and more work to his unnamed helpers, and rapidly the strip fell into oblivion.

== Story list ==
The Jeff Hawke stories
No.	Title	Writer	Artist	Strip numbers	Dates	Reprinted in
1	(Space Rider)	SJ	SJ	1 - 138	1954-02-15 - 1954-07-26	Jeff Hawke's Cosmos, Vol 1 Number 1 and 2
2	(The Martian Invasion)	SJ	SJ	139 - 388	1954-07-27 - 1955-06-22	Jeff Hawke's Cosmos: The Martian Quartet
3	(The Search For Asteron)	SJ	SJ	389 - 502	1955-06-23 - 1955-11-01	Jeff Hawke's Cosmos: The Martian Quartet
4	(The Threat Of The Past)	SJ	SJ	503 - 642	1955-11-02 - 1956-04-16	Jeff Hawke's Cosmos: The Martian Quartet
5	Opposite Power	SJ	SJ	643 - 702	1956-04-17 - 1956-06-25	Jeff Hawke's Cosmos: The Martian Quartet
6	Sanctuary	WP/SJ	SJ	703 - 809	1956-06-26 - 1956-10-27	Jeff Hawke's Cosmos, Vol 2 Number 2
7	Unquiet Island	WP	SJ	810 - 927	1956-10-29 - 1957-03-16	Jeff Hawke's Cosmos, Vol 6 Number 1
8	The Castaway	SJ	SJ	928 - 1098	1957-03-18 - 1957-10-03	Jeff Hawke's Cosmos, Vol 6 Number 2
9	Out Of Touch	HH	SJ	1099 - 1253	1957-10-04 - 1958-04-05	Jeff Hawke's Cosmos, Vol 5 Number 2
10	The Dream Pedlars	SJ	SJ	1254 - 1399	1958-04-07 - 1958-09-23	Jeff Hawke's Cosmos, Vol 2 Number 3
11	Poles Apart	WP/SJ	SJ	1400 - 1544	1958-09-24 - 1959-03-13	Jeff Hawke's Cosmos, Vol 3 Number 2
12	Sacrifice	SJ	SJ	1545 - 1712	1959-03-14 - 1959-09-26	Jeff Hawke's Cosmos, Vol 1 Number 3, Vol 2, Number 1
13	Time Out Of Mind	SJ	SJ	1713 - 1824	1959-09-28 - 1960-02-09	Jeff Hawke's Cosmos: Lunar 10
14	Overlord	WP	SJ	1825 - 1939	1960-02-10 - 1960-06-20	T1, Jeff Hawke's Cosmos, Vol 7 Number 3
15	Survival	WP	SJ	1940 - 2011	1960-06-21 - 1960-09-12	T1, Jeff Hawke's Cosmos, Vol 7 Number 1
16	Wondrous Lamp	WP	SJ	2012 - 2163	1960-09-13 - 1961-03-11	T1, Jeff Hawke's Cosmos, Vol 6 Number 2
17	Counsel For The Defense	WP	SJ	2164 - 2285	1961-03-13 - 1961-08-02	T1, Jeff Hawke's Cosmos, Vol 7 Number 2
18	Pastmaster	WP	SJ	2286 - 2351	1961-08-03 - 1961-10-18	T2, Jeff Hawke's Cosmos: Lunar 10
19	Immortal Toys	WP	SJ	2352 - 2494	1961-10-19 - 1962-04-05	T2, Jeff Hawke's Cosmos, Vol 7 Number 3
20	The Ambassadors	WP	SJ	2495 - 2578	1962-04-06 - 1962-07-13	T2, Jeff Hawke's Cosmos, Vol 7 Number 3
21	The Gamesman	WP	SJ	2579 - 2639	1962-07-14 - 1962-09-23	T2, Jeff Hawke's Cosmos, Vol 3 Number 3
22	A Test Case	WP	SJ	2640 - 2724	1962-09-24 - 1963-01-02	T2, Jeff Hawke's Cosmos, Vol 4 Number 1
23	Pass The Parcel	SJ	SJ	2725 - 2816	1963-01-03 - 1963-04-20	Jeff Hawke's Cosmos, Vol 3 Number 1
24	The Changeling	WP	SJ	2817 - 2884	1963-04-21 - 1963-07-08	Jeff Hawke's Cosmos, Vol 5 Number 2
25	Rip Van Haddow	WP	SJ	2885 - 2950	1963-07-09 - 1963-09-24	Jeff Hawke's Cosmos, Vol 1 Number 1
26	Prodigal Son	WP	SJ	2951 - 3024	1963-09-25 - 1963-12-19	Jeff Hawke's Cosmos, Vol 1 Number 2
27	Uncanny Deep	WP	SJ	3025 - 3082	1963-12-20 - 1964-01-27	Jeff Hawke's Cosmos, Vol 5 Number 1
28	Winner Loses All	SJ	SJ	3083 - 3152	1964-01-28 - 1964-05-21	Jeff Hawke's Cosmos, Vol 5 Number 1
29	Faery Land Forlorn	WP	SJ	3153 - 3238	1964-05-22 - 1964-08-29	Jeff Hawke's Cosmos, Vol 5 Number 3
30	A Foreign Body	WP	SJ	3239 - 3283	1964-08-31 - 1964-10-22	Jeff Hawke's Cosmos, Vol 3 Number 2
31	Moonstruck	SJ	SJ	3284 - 3327	1964-10-23 - 1964-12-11	Jeff Hawke's Cosmos: Lunar 10
32	The Helping Hand	WP	SJ	3328 - 3395	1964-12-12 - 1965-03-03	Jeff Hawke's Cosmos, Vol 4 Number 2
33	Anti-gravity Man	WP	SJ	3396 - 3504	1965-03-04 - 1965-07-09	Jeff Hawke's Cosmos, Vol 2 Number 1
34	Made In Birmingham	WP	SJ	3505 - 3566	1965-07-10 - 1965-09-20	Jeff Hawke's Cosmos, Vol 5 Number 2
35	The Oil Rig	WP	SJ	3567 - 3623	1965-09-21 - 1965-11-25	Jeff Hawke's Cosmos, Vol 7 Number 2
36	Incognito	WP	SJ	3624 - 3644	1965-11-26 - 1965-12-20	Jeff Hawke's Cosmos, Vol 4 Number 1
37	The Great Atlantic Crossing	WP	SJ	3645 - 3735	1965-12-21 - 1966-04-08	Jeff Hawke's Cosmos, Vol 2 Number 3
38	Getaway	WP	SJ	3736 - 3753	1966-04-09 - 1966-04-29	Jeff Hawke's Cosmos, Vol 7 Number 2
39	Ghost Errant	WP	SJ	3754 - 3819	1966-04-30 - 1966-07-15	Jeff Hawke's Cosmos, Vol 2 Number 2
40	A Word Of Advice	WP	SJ	3820-3846	1966-07-16 - 1966-08-16	Jeff Hawke's Cosmos, Vol 4 Number 1
41	The Intelligent Ones	WP	SJ	3847 - 3896	1966-08-17 - 1966-10-13	Jeff Hawke's Cosmos: Hawke's Notes
42	Wildcat	WP	SJ	3897 - 3951	1966-10-14 - 1966-12-16	Jeff Hawke's Cosmos, Vol 4 Number 2
43	Overland	WP	SJ	3952 - 4084	1966-12-17 - 1967-05-24	Jeff Hawke's Cosmos, Vol 6 Number 3
44	The Engine That Worked On Grass	WP	SJ	4085 - 4173	1967-05-25 - 1967-09-05	Jeff Hawke's Cosmos, Vol 5 Number 3
45	The Hole In Space	WP	SJ	4174 - 4261	1967-09-06 - 1967-12-16	Jeff Hawke's Cosmos, Vol 7 Number 3
46	The Venusian Club	WP	SJ	4262 - 4361	1967-12-18 - 1968-04-15	Jeff Hawke's Cosmos, Vol 7 Number 1
47	Cataclysm	WP	SJ	4362 - 4433	1968-04-16 - 1968-07-09	Jeff Hawke's Cosmos, Vol 6 Number 3
48	The Poltergeist	WP	SJ	4434 - 4517	1968-07-10 - 1968-11-22	Jeff Hawke's Cosmos, Vol 3 Number 2
49	Rogue Star	WP	SJ	4518 - 4595	1968-11-23 - 1969-02-24	Jeff Hawke's Cosmos, Vol 5 Number 3
50	The Day The Moon Nearly Exploded	WP	SJ	4596 - 4643	1969-02-25 - 1969-04-21	Jeff Hawke's Cosmos: Lunar 10
51	The Strange Ship	WP	SJ	4644 - 4700	1969-04-22 - 1969-06-29	Jeff Hawke's Cosmos: Lunar 10
52	Daughter Of Eros	SJ	SJ/NF	4701 - 4839	1969-06-30 - 1969-12-08	Jeff Hawke's Cosmos, Vol 7 Number 1
53	S. O. S.	SJ	SJ/NF	4840 - 4916	1969-12-09 - 1970-03-10	Jeff Hawke's Cosmos, Vol 4 Number 3
54	Rescue Party	SJ	SJ/NF	4917 - 5008	1970-03-11 - 1970-07-01	Jeff Hawke's Cosmos, Vol 4 Number 3
55	Chacondar!	SJ	SJ/NF	5009 - 5074	1970-07-02 - 1970-09-16	Jeff Hawke's Cosmos, Vol 1 Number 3
56	The Book Of The Worlds	SJ	SJ/NF	5075 - 5172	1970-09-17 - 1971-01-10	Jeff Hawke's Cosmos, Vol 6 Number 1
57	Time Is Out Of Joint	SJ	SJ/NF	5173 - 5254	1971-01-12 - 1971-04-20	Jeff Hawke's Cosmos, Vol 6 Number 1
58	Someday I'll Find You	SJ	SJ/NF	5255 - 5330	1971-04-21 - 1971-07-17	Jeff Hawke's Cosmos, Vol 7 Number 1
59	The Bees On Daedalus	SJ	SJ/NF	5331 - 5400	1971-07-19 - 1971-10-07	Jeff Hawke's Cosmos, Vol 6 Number 3
60	Here Be Tygers	SJ	SJ/NF	5401 - 5498	1971-10-08 - 1972-02-01	Jeff Hawke's Cosmos, Vol 4 Number 3
61	Selena	SJ	SJ/NF	5499 - 5625	1972-02-02 - 1972-06-29	Jeff Hawke's Cosmos: Lunar 10
62	Sitting Tenants	SJ	SJ/NF	5626 - 5778	1972-06-30 - 1973-01-01	Jeff Hawke's Cosmos, Vol 3 Number 3
63	Shorty's Secret	SJ	SJ/NF/MA	5779 - 5904	1973-01-02 - 1973-05-31	Jeff Hawke's Cosmos: Lunar 10
64	On The Run	SJ	SJ/NF	5905 - 6001	1973-06-01 - 1973-09-21	Jeff Hawke's Cosmos, Vol 4 Number 2
65	The Comet's Tale	SJ	SJ/NF	6002 - 6118	1973-09-22 - 1974-02-09	Jeff Hawke's Cosmos, Vol 6 Number 2
66	The First Person Plural	SJ	SJ/NF	6119 - 6175	1974-02-11 - 1974-04-18	Jeff Hawke's Cosmos, Vol 4 Number 1
67	The Winds Of Mars	SJ	SJ	6176 - 6257	1975-11-04 - 1976-??-??	Jeff Hawke's Cosmos, Vol 7 Number 2
68	Moratorro	SJ	SJ	6258 - 6413	1975-05-05 - 1975-11-01	Jeff Hawke's Cosmos, Vol 5 Number 1
69	Heir Apparent	SJ	SJ/BB/PN	6414 - 6487		Jeff Hawke's Cosmos: Lunar 10

Note - T1 and T2 refer to the two books published by Titan Books. Jeff Hawke's Cosmos is a publication of the Jeff Hawke Club. All the Jeff Hawke stories have been published in nine volumes by the club.

== Themes ==
A typical Jeff Hawke strip.

Jeff Hawke started as a conventional hero-vs-aliens science fiction action comic, but under Patterson's direction it quickly developed its own individual style. The three frames format of the daily strip made it hard to create vivid action scenes, so the stories centred more on dialogue than on action and violence (although these do occur).

The Jeff Hawke character himself became more and more focused on reasoning, diplomacy and moral virtues instead of brute force and bravery, and he is frequently forced by circumstances to be the ambassador of mankind in front of alien species. There are many circumstances in which Jeff Hawke is more an observer than a participant. The real main characters in Jeff Hawke were the aliens. The universe of Jeff Hawke was highly populated with strange alien species that came in contact with humans for various reasons – accidental contact, commercial interests, and so on, but hardly ever for invasion. The plots of Jeff Hawke turned around the seemingly endless, baroque diversity of aliens and their worlds, their contacts with humans, and the ability of Hawke and his friends to manage relationships with so many different entities. The subtle wit of Patterson made the creatures and the plots revolving around them as fascinating as they were amusing, whereas the highly expressive Jordan drawing style fully captured the strangeness of the various worlds and creatures. The aliens were almost always much more technologically advanced and wise than humans, and often the plots were highly critical of various "primitive" aspects of the human race, like pollution.

Often in the plots of Jeff Hawke there was a connection between extraterrestrial entities, archaeological mysteries and even supernatural creatures. The god Pan and the devil, among others, appeared in Jeff Hawke strips.

There was also a softcore erotic flavour in some strips. For example, there were some instances in which alien creatures took the shape of beautiful young women.

== Characters ==
Apart from Jeff Hawke himself, there are not many recurring characters in the comic, and almost no stable one. Here are listed the ones that recur the most.

- Jeff Hawke: A well-educated ex-pilot, with an outstanding scientific and archaeological knowledge and a seraphic, ironic attitude. He usually wears a sober suit and a necktie, except when he's forced to use a spacesuit (which happens quite often).
- Laura: The girlfriend of Jeff Hawke, almost disappears after the first stories.
- Mac McLean: A Canadian air force pilot, he is Jeff Hawke's aid in many situations and one of the few human recurring characters.
- Kolvorok: The First Official of the Intergalactic Police. A funny, one-eyed, jellyfish-shaped tentacled alien, it is as verbose as it is inept.
- Chalcedon: A gigantic humanoid, and a mischievous, arrogant, clever interstellar criminal. He always manages to escape both Jeff Hawke and the Intergalactic Police.

== Recognition ==
Despite being published in an English newspaper, Jeff Hawke is practically unknown in English-speaking countries. On the other hand, it gained considerable popularity in Italy, Sweden, Spain, ex-Yugoslavia and some other European countries.

In the United States, Jeff Hawke was printed in the Deseret News and was reprinted in Menomonee Falls Gazette.

== Jeff Hawke and the Apollo Moon landings ==
The final frame of the strip H1760.

In the strip H1760, published 21 November 1959, it is possible to see a stone that commemorates the first human landing on the Moon, noting that it happened on 4 August 1969. Thus, Sydney Jordan and William Patterson forecast the real date of this event with an error of only two weeks, ten years before Neil Armstrong made the first descent to the Moon surface on July 21.

== Original model ==
In the introduction to The Jeff Hawke Book Two: Counsel for the Defence (Titan Books, 1986), Sydney Jordan states:

The discerning may recognise from my drawings of Hawke, that I used Hans Meyer as a model.

South African actor Hans Meyer later went on to feature in a number of TV shows including BBC TV's Colditz as Hauptmann Ullmann.

== Collected editions ==
In 1985, Nick Landau of Titan Books was finding considerable success with Judge Dredd and other 2000AD collections, and obtained the rights to publish some Jeff Hawke collections, and with them "[n]early 7,000 [copies of] episodes in a huge ungainly pile" from the Express offices. He approached artist and fan Brian Bolland, who suggested "Overlord" as the first story to be collected, and duly produced a cover for the collection. A second collection followed soon after, subtitled "Counsel for the Defence," also under a newly commissioned cover from the popular Dredd and Camelot 3000 artist, Bolland. Bolland notes, though, that "[s]ales of the Jeff Hawke collections were obviously disappointing, so there were only two." Plans were already afoot for a third collection, and the shelved book, Bolland reports, would have "contained another great story "The Ambassadors"."

In 2008, Titan Books resurrected the Patterson-era comic strip collections in a hardback archival - 'collector's' - format, issued alongside their similar hardback Dan Dare and Charley's War collections, and in tandem with other collections of Daily Express strip favourites Modesty Blaise and James Bond.

The first book covered the same contents as the two volumes from nearly twenty-five-years previously; the second volume echoes Bolland's recollection of the mooted contents of the unpublished original third volume. The books are:

- Overlord (collects "Overlord", "Survival", "Wondrous Lamp" and "Counsel for the Defence", 128 pages, February 2008, ISBN 1-84576-597-4)
- The Ambassadors (collects "The Ambassadors", "Pastmaster", "The Immortal Toys", "The Gamesman" and "A Test Case", 128 pages, July 2008, ISBN 1-84576-598-2)

The British Jeff Hawke Club began reprinting Jeff Hawke in its journal, Jeff Hawke's Cosmos, in 2003. Each issue includes story notes on the science featured in the story, and commentary on the origins of the tales from creator Sydney Jordan. In addition to the regular magazine, five special editions - The Martian Quartet, Lunar 10, Earthspace, Epilogue, and Hawke's Notes have also been published.
