= Typhoon Wipha (2007) =

Pacific typhoon in 2007

Typhoon Wipha (Goring)
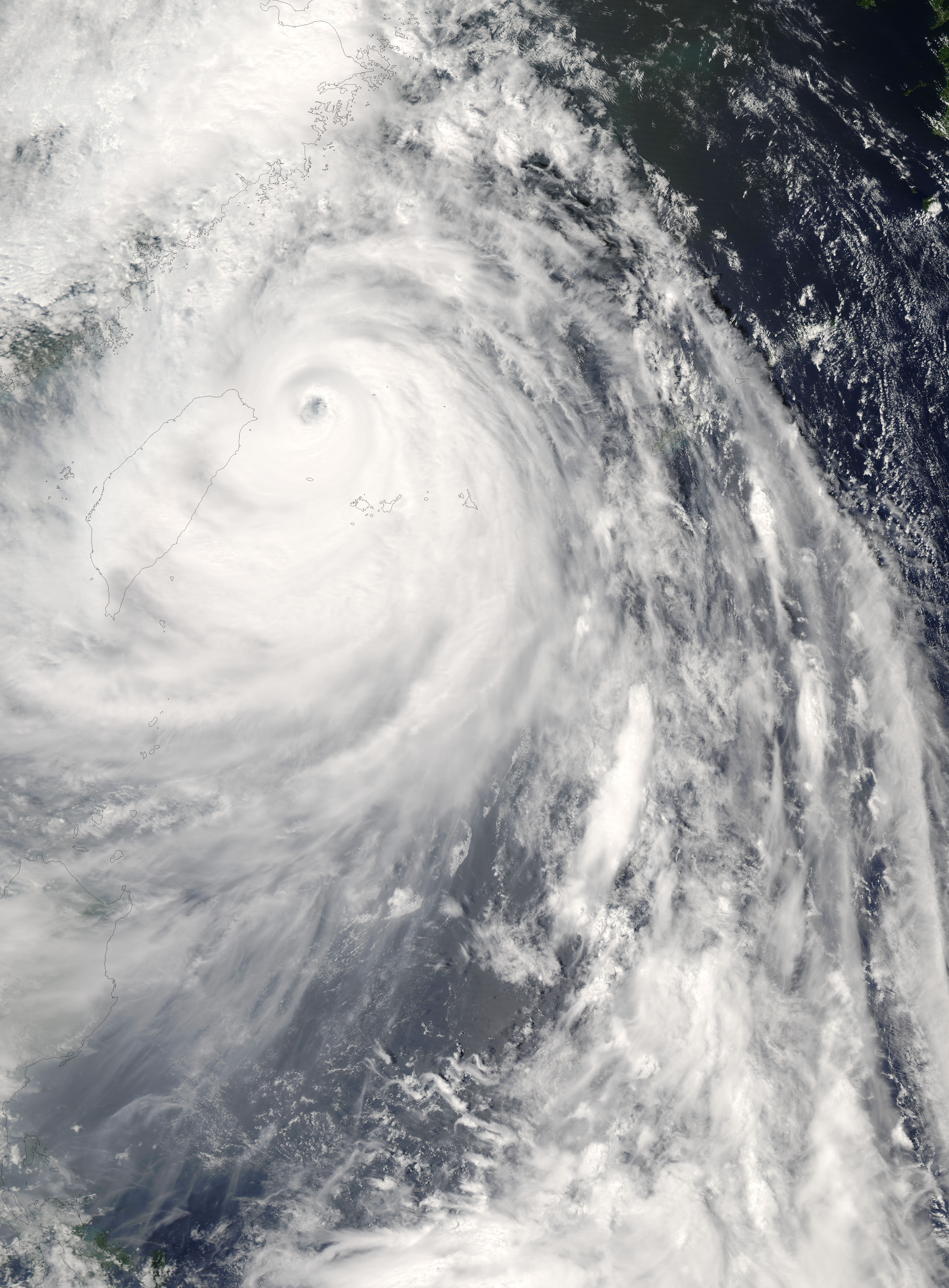
- Typhoon Wipha at peak intensity and approaching Taiwan on September 18

Meteorological history
- Formed: September 15, 2007
- Extratropical: September 20, 2007
- Dissipated: September 22, 2007

Very strong typhoon
- 10-minute sustained (JMA)
- Highest winds: 185 km/h (115 mph)
- Lowest pressure: 925 hPa (mbar); 27.32 inHg

Category 4-equivalent super typhoon
- 1-minute sustained (SSHWS/JTWC)
- Highest winds: 250 km/h (155 mph)
- Lowest pressure: 922 hPa (mbar); 27.23 inHg

Overall effects
- Fatalities: 20
- Missing: 7
- Damage: $1.3 billion (2007 USD)
- Areas affected: Philippines, Taiwan, China, Japan, South Korea and North Korea
- IBTrACS
- Part of the 2007 Pacific typhoon season

Typhoon Wipha, (Note: The name Wipha (Thai: วิภา, [wi˦˥(ʔ) pʰaː˧]) was contributed by Thailand and is a feminine given name meaning "luster, brilliance" in Thai.) known in the Philippines as Super Typhoon Goring, was the strongest typhoon to threaten the Chinese coastline since Typhoon Saomai in August 2006. Forming out of a tropical disturbance on September 15, 2007, it quickly developed into a tropical storm, and intensified into a typhoon the following day with the appearance of an eye feature. After a period of rapid intensification, Wipha attained its peak intensity on September 18, with winds of 185 km/h (115 mph) and a barometric pressure of 925 mbar (hPa), according to the Japan Meteorological Agency. Later that day, the storm began to weaken as it interacted with the mountainous terrain of Taiwan before brushing the northern edge of the island. Wipha subsequently made landfall near Fuding along the Fujian–Zhejiang provincial border with winds estimated at 185 km/h (115 mph) by the JTWC. Shortly thereafter, the typhoon weakened as it moved inland, weakening to a tropical storm within 18 hours of moving over land.

Nearly 2 million residents along the Chinese coastline evacuated ahead of Typhoon Wipha's arrival. Nearly 20,000 Chinese soldiers were deployed to the area to assist residents in reinforcing flood barriers and speeding up evacuations. The typhoon triggered severe flooding with rainfall in excess of 353 mm (13.9 in). Roughly 13,000 homes were destroyed, 57,000 more were damaged and 100,000 hectares of farmland was inundated. Throughout China, 14 people were killed and damage amounted to ¥7.45 billion (US$1 billion).

Although the center of the storm did not pass near the Philippines, its outer rainbands brought severe flooding to Negros Occidental. Two people died and three others were listed as missing. Damage amounted to PHP 15.3 million (US$314,000). In Taiwan, high winds killed one person and injured another. Up to 495 mm (19.5 in) of precipitation caused landslides and flooding across the island. Agricultural losses in Taiwan amounted to NT$7.8 million (US$236,300). In Okinawa, high winds and rainfall up to 335 mm (13.2 in) caused significant damage and resulted in two fatalities. Seven homes across the islands were destroyed and damage totaled ¥28.3 billion (US$285 million).

== Meteorological history ==
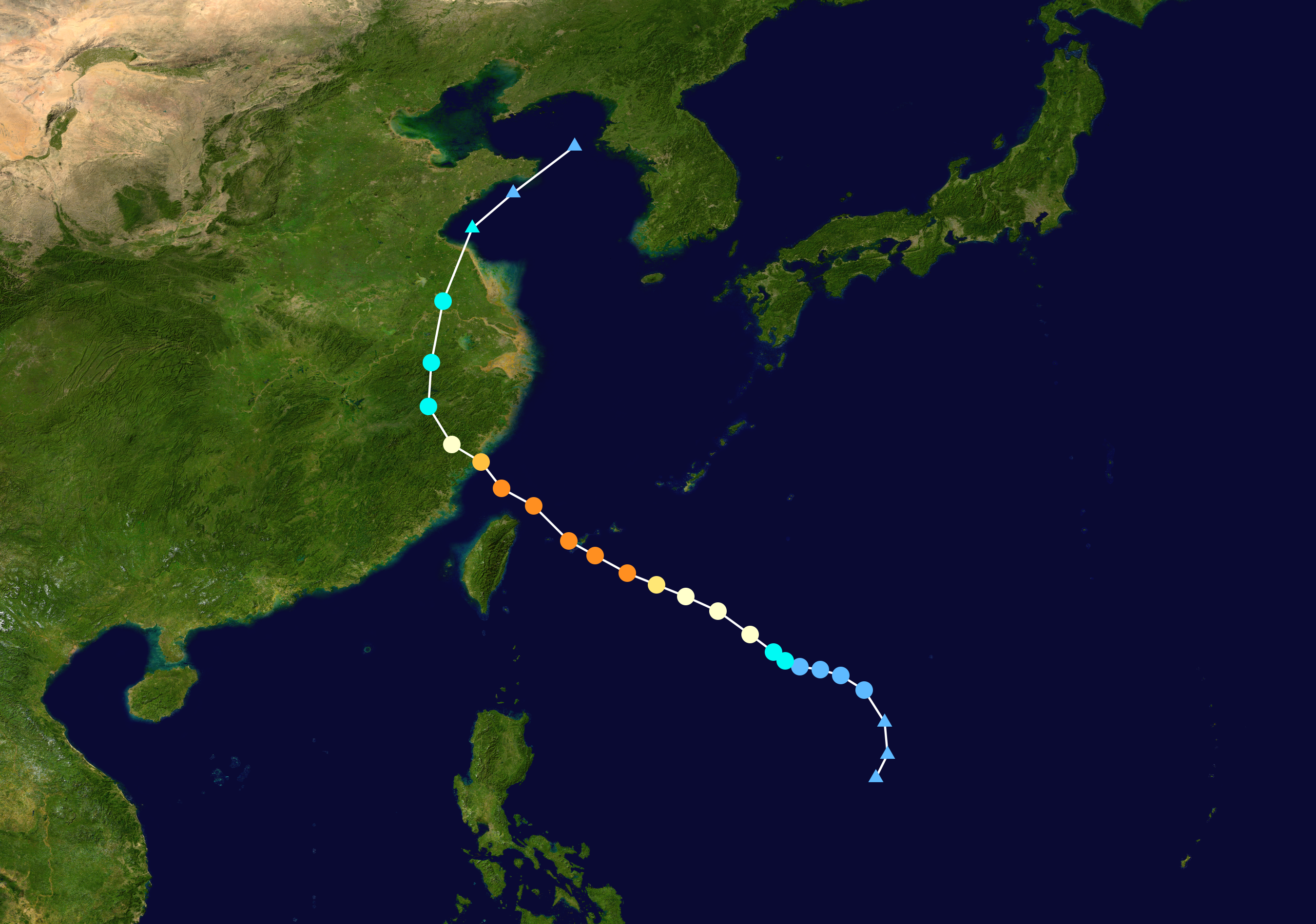
Map plotting the storm's track and intensity, according to the Saffir–Simpson scale Map key Saffir–Simpson scale Tropical depression (≤38 mph, ≤62 km/h) Tropical storm (39–73 mph, 63–118 km/h) Category 1 (74–95 mph, 119–153 km/h) Category 2 (96–110 mph, 154–177 km/h) Category 3 (111–129 mph, 178–208 km/h) Category 4 (130–156 mph, 209–251 km/h) Category 5 (≥157 mph, ≥252 km/h) Unknown Storm type Tropical cyclone Subtropical cyclone Extratropical cyclone, remnant low, tropical disturbance, or monsoon depression

Typhoon Wipha originated from a tropical disturbance that was first identified by the Joint Typhoon Warning Center (JTWC) on September 13, 2007 roughly 1,435 km (892 mi) east of Guam. Deep convection had developed around an area of low pressure that formed within the disturbance. Low wind shear allowed the system to steadily develop as it moved northward. Late on September 14, convective banding features had formed around the center of circulation, prompting the JTWC to issue a Tropical Cyclone Formation Alert. Several hours later, the Japan Meteorological Agency (JMA) began monitoring the system as a tropical depression. At the same time, the JTWC declared that the disturbance had become Tropical Depression 13W. Shortly thereafter, the Philippine Atmospheric, Geophysical and Astronomical Services Administration (PAGASA) also began issuing advisories on the developing depression, assigning it the local name Goring. Initially, a tropical upper tropospheric trough situated to the north of the depression suppressed convective development and outflow. However, late on September 15, this system weakened, leading to both the JTWC and JMA upgrading the depression to a tropical storm early on September 16. Upon being declared a tropical storm, the JMA assigned the name Wipha to the storm.

Throughout September 16, Wipha underwent a brief period of rapid intensification, with the JTWC upgrading it to a Category 1 hurricane, on the Saffir–Simpson hurricane scale, within 12 hours. The intensifying system maintained a northwesterly track in response to a subtropical ridge over the northwest Pacific. Early on September 17, Wipha was upgraded to a typhoon as 10-minute sustained winds reached 120 km/h (75 mph). A second round of rapid intensification took place through most of the day, leading to the typhoon attaining its peak intensity late on September 17 with winds of 185 km/h (115 mph) 10-minute sustained) and a barometric pressure of 1 mbar (hPa; 27.32 inHg). At the same time, the JTWC assessed Wipha to have nearly attained Category 5 status, peaking as a high-end Category 4 super typhoon with winds of 250 km/h (160 mph) 1-minute sustained). Upon reaching this intensity, Wipha became the second strongest storm of the 2007 Pacific typhoon season.

Not long after reaching its peak intensity, Wipha began to weaken as it started to interact with the high terrain of Taiwan. Early on September 18, PAGASA issued their final advisory on Typhoon Goring as it left their area of responsibility. Later that day, the center of the typhoon passed roughly 130 km/h (80 mi) north of Taipei, Taiwan. Continued weakening took place as the storm neared landfall in mainland China. Around 1800 UTC, the eye of Wipha crossed the Chinese coastline near Wenzhou with sustained winds of 140 km/h (87 mph) 10-minute sustained). The JTWC assessed Wipha to have made landfall as a low-end Category 3 typhoon with winds of 185 km/h (115 mph) 1-minute sustained). Rapid weakening took place as the storm moved further inland. The JTWC issued their final advisory on Wipha during the afternoon of September 19 as they classified the system as an extratropical cyclone. However, the JMA continued to monitor the system as a tropical depression until September 20. At this time, the remnants of Wipha had entered the Yellow Sea and accelerated northeastward towards the Korean Peninsula. The extratropical remnants of Wipha persisted for several more hours before dissipating off the coast of North Korea that afternoon.

== Preparations ==
=== Taiwan ===
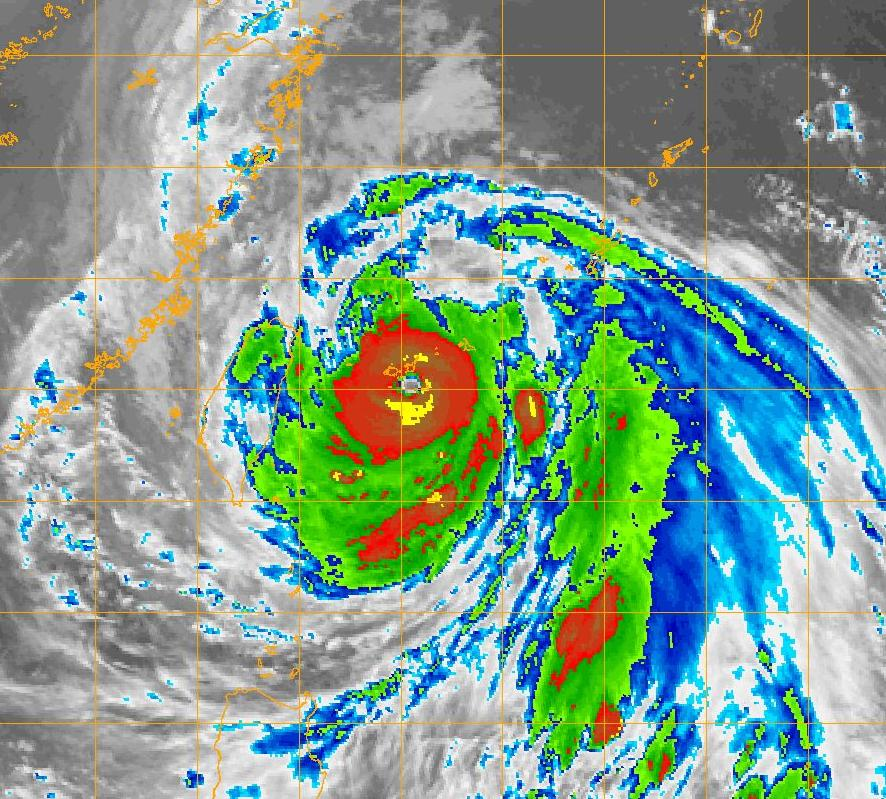
Infrared satellite image of Typhoon Wipha near Yaeyama Islands on September 17

The Songshan Airport in Taipei was shut down due to the threat of Typhoon Wipha. All businesses, including the stock exchange, were closed for September 18. Typhoon warnings were issued in northern areas of the island and residents were warned about the possibility of landslides in the mountainous regions. Accordingly, 169 people left landslide-prone areas. An additional 237 people were evacuated from the northern areas of Taiwan due to the storm. A code red alert was issued for the areas closest to the center of the cyclone. Nearly 4,300 Chinese fishermen sought refuge in Taiwan after being called back to port.

=== China ===
As Wipha approached the Chinese coastline, threatening the city of Shanghai, one of the largest evacuations in the country's history took place. Local media warned that Wipha "may be the most destructive typhoon in a decade." More than 2 million people evacuated from coastal areas, 1.79 million of whom were in Zhejiang Province, the largest relocation of residents in the history of Zhejiang. Following the issuance of a Super Typhoon Warning, Shanghai officials evacuated 291,000 people from old buildings, temporary construction sites, and those who live near the coast. About 20,000 soldiers were sent to assist in the evacuation and reinforce flood barriers. A parade which was scheduled to take place in Shanghai was cancelled due to the warnings. About 365 workers were evacuated from the Pinghu oil rig located in the East China Sea. Zoos caged animals and increased staff numbers to prevent escape and contain any fires which may be sparked by downed power lines. More than 39,000 people were evacuated from Jiangsu Province, mainly along the coast. Numerous cities cancelled schools and closed business for the day of and following the typhoon. The typhoon also caused FIFA to reschedule four matches in the Women's World Cup. Nearly 40,000 vessels were recalled to port throughout China. About 250,000 people were also evacuated from Fujian Province with an additional 1.41 million text messages were also sent out to residents in the province. The China Meteorological Administration (CMA) commenced "level one" emergency plan, the highest state of emergency. The Office of State Flood Control and Drought Relief commenced a "level two" flood control emergency plan and sent four teams to the provinces which were anticipated to be impacted by Wipha. About 50,000 factories in Zhejiang were shut down until Wipha passed. The large-scale evacuations resulted in a lower loss of life from the typhoon.

=== Japan and South Korea ===
In Okinawa, about 30,000 people were evacuated from low-lying areas near rivers which threatened to overflow their banks. At least 50 flights in and out of the prefecture were also cancelled or delayed. Already hit by Typhoon Nari just a few days prior to Wipha, South Korea began evacuating residents as the remnants of the typhoon were expected to hit the country. Rainfall was expected to impact South Korea for several days with accumulations exceeding 150 mm (5.9 in). About 940 people were evacuated to shelters throughout the country.

== Impact ==
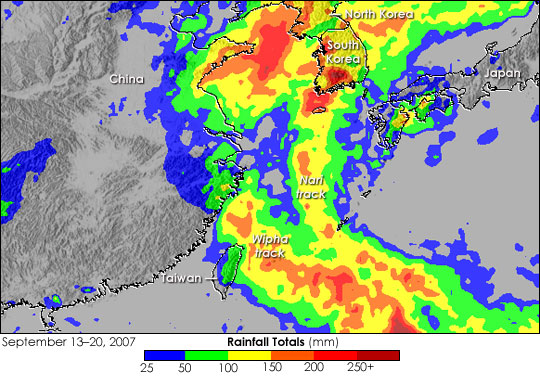
Estimated rainfall totals from Typhoons Wipha and Nari from September 13–20

=== Philippines ===
Although Wipha did not directly impact the Philippines, the outer bands of the storm produced severe flooding in Negros Occidental. The flooding washed out large areas of agricultural land worth PHP 10.3 million (US$211,000). Numerous farm to market roads were also damaged or destroyed, costing PHP 5 million (US$103,000). The floods also destroyed 13 homes and damaged 31 others. A rare tornado spawned by the storm destroyed four homes and damaged 19 others. A total of 7,640 families were affected by Wipha in the Philippines. The heavy rains caused a landslide which killed one person on September 16. Another man drowned in a flood swollen river on September 21. Three other people were listed as missing after being swept away in a river swollen by Wipha.

=== Taiwan ===
One person was killed and another was injured in Taipei after a 20 m (66 ft) high scaffolding in a construction site collapsed. At least 495 mm (19.5 in) of rain fell in the mountains of Taiwan, triggering flooding which damaged about 24 hectares of crops, leaving NT$7.8 million (US$236,300) in losses. A total of 8,795 residences were left without power at the height of the storm. Several roads and bridges were also washed out from flooding. Officials in Taiwan recorded 29 landslides, mostly in northern areas, and urged residents to evacuate due to the possibility of more.

=== China ===
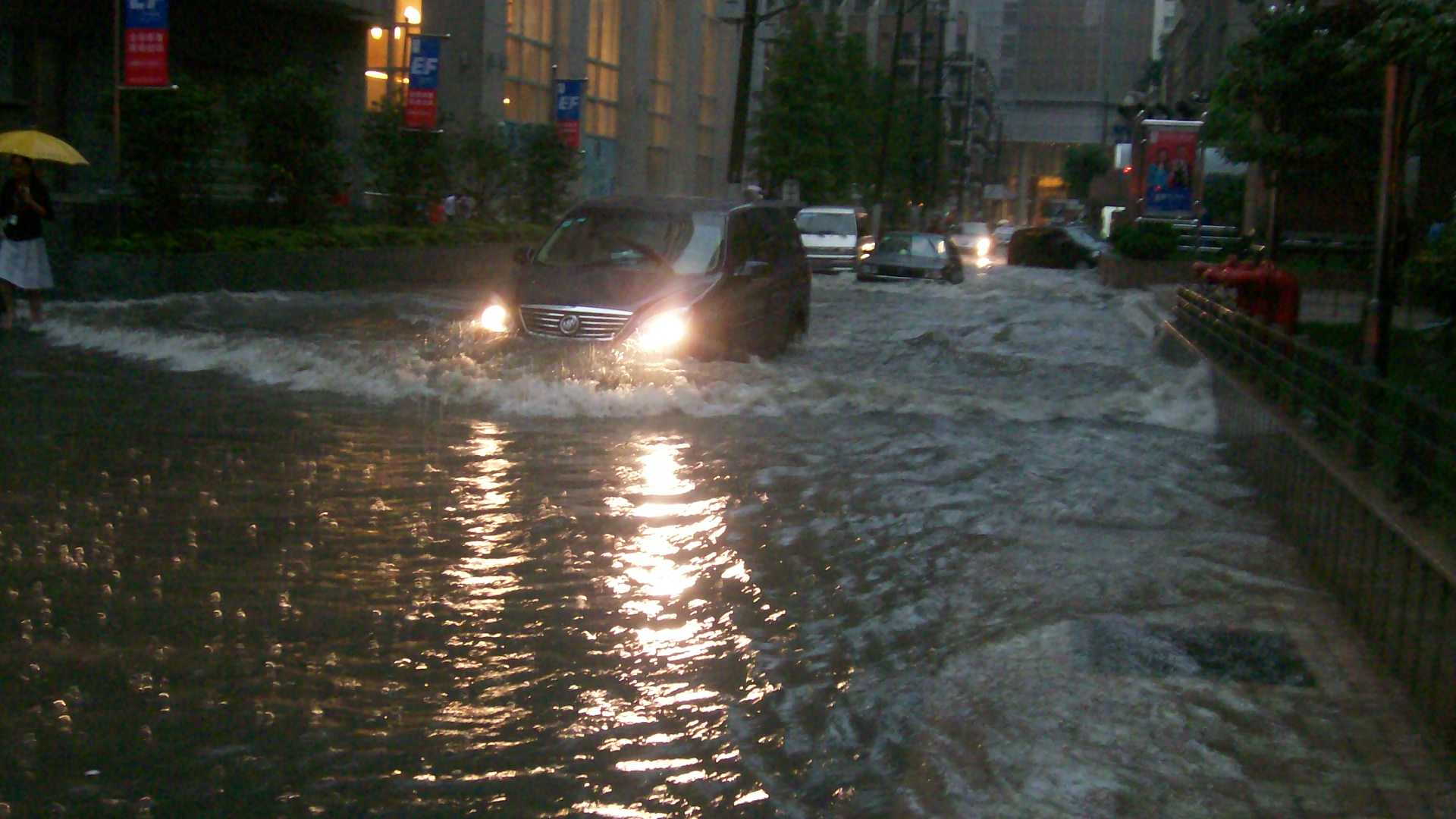
Flooding in Shanghai, China

The outer bands of Typhoon Wipha began impacting parts of eastern China on September 17. Heavy rains dropped up to 162 millimetres (6.4 in) in some cities, causing rivers to near flood stage. Eighty streets in Shanghai flooded due to the rains ahead of Wipha, with news reports showing waters rising up to people's knees. Upwards of 191 millimetres (7.5 in) of additional rain fell during the typhoon, causing significant flooding which destroyed at least 13,000 homes, damaged 57,000 others, and flooded over 160,000 hectares of farmland. At least 1,900 communities were left without power as high winds knocked down numerous power lines. A total of 14 people were killed in China in direct relation to Wipha. One man was electrocuted and died after stepping into floodwaters with live power lines submerged in the water. A landslide triggered by the heavy rains killed five people. At least 11 million people were affected by the storm in Fujian and Zhejiang. Once floodwaters receded, a car was found turned over, the five passengers inside were declared dead on scene. Damages in China amounted to ¥7.45 billion ($1 billion USD).

=== Japan ===
As Wipha brushed Okinawa, it produced upwards of 335 mm (13.2 in) throughout the islands, peaking on Ishigaki. The highest winds were recorded on Ohara, Okinawa at 140 km/h (87 mph). Typhoon Wipha killed two people, one of which died during the evacuation from an illness, injured six others, and left another missing throughout the country. A total of seven homes were destroyed, four were damaged, and 39 others were affected. About 3,931 hectares of farmland, 7 km (4.3 mi) of roads, and three ports, along with ten ships, were damaged or destroyed. At the height of the storm, about 10,800 residences were without power. Damages from the storm amounted to ¥28.3 billion ($285 million USD).

=== North Korea ===
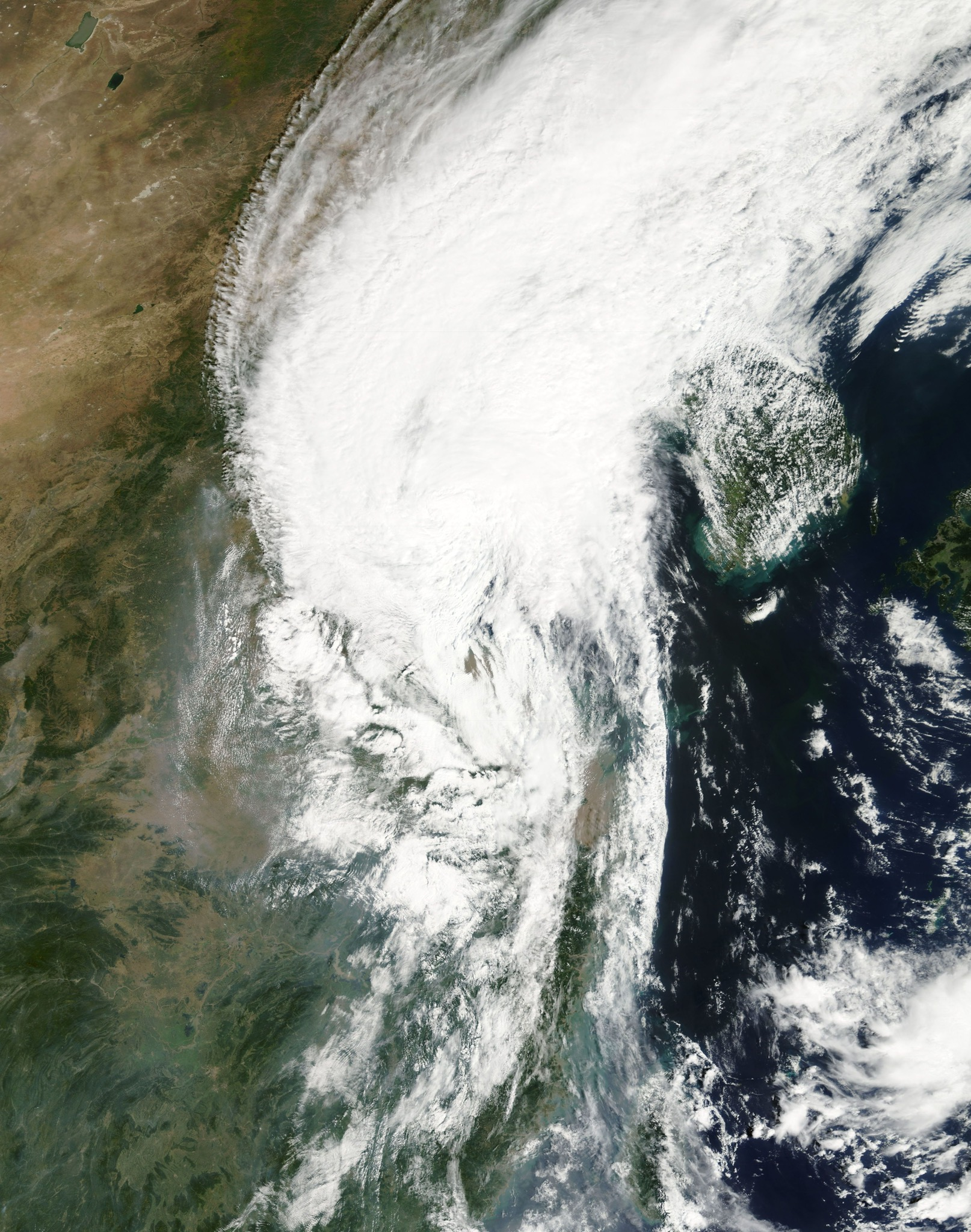
The remnants of Wipha approaching the Korean Peninsula on September 20

Heavy rainfall from the typhoon's remnants, ruined over 100,000 hectares of crops and either damaged or destroyed 14,000 homes. Additionally, over 8,000 public buildings were partially or fully demolished. A total of 1,649 people were left homeless following the storm. A month prior to Wipha, deadly flooding impacted most of the country, leaving at least 600 people dead or missing and destroyed thousands of structures.

== Aftermath ==
=== Philippines and China ===
Following the flooding, the local governments in Valladolid and San Enrique declared a state of calamity to allow funds to reach flood victims. By September 26, about PHP 700,000 (US$14,000) worth of relief supplies had been distributed to the affected areas. At least PHP 480,000 (US$10,000) of the calamity funds were sent to the local governments in Negros Occidental. On September 20, the Chinese Government allocated ¥81 million ($11.8 million USD) in living subsidies for those affected by the typhoon. The International Red Cross, which was already assisting China in recovery from flooding in August, took preparatory measures and worked with local branches to get damage assessments. The Zhejiang Red Cross branch provided ¥200,000 (US$29,000) in relief items to the hardest hit areas.

=== North Korea ===
Following the impacts of Wipha to the already severely flooded areas of North Korea, the International Red Cross delivered relief supplies to the 2,000 people made homeless by the typhoon. Hundreds of medical clinics which were damaged or destroyed set up makeshift clinics as up to 70 percent of the affected population reported abdominal pains or diarrhea. More than 23,000 volunteers from the Red Cross mobilized to provide quick rehabilitation in the affected regions. By mid-September, €420,000 ($527,000 USD) was provided to repair hospitals and an additional €110,000 (US$138,000) was planned to be sent. By the end of September, health kits were provided for 300,000 people and an additional $300,000 (USD) was provided for medical supplies in hospitals. From October 15 to 18, a Rapid Nutritional Screening of children took place in the worst affected areas. Eleven hospitals were restocked with medical supplies and a permanent water supply was constructed at the Wonsan general hospital. About $180,000 in aid from Norway was sent to North Korea. By October 22, 2007, 80 percent of the $14.1 million pledged in assistance had been funded. About 4,800 tonnes of cereal was to be distributed in October as part of the second shipment of food, following the first which was sent prior to Wipha. Funds and materials, worth $166,000 (USD), for revegetation were expected to arrive between December 2007 and February 2008.

== See also ==
- Other tropical cyclones named Wipha
- Other tropical cyclones named Goring
- Typhoon Fitow (2013)
- Typhoon Chan-hom (2015)
- Typhoon Sinlaku (2002)
- Typhoon Lekima (2019)
- Typhoon Krosa (2007)
- Typhoon Doksuri (2023)
