= Harry Goring =

Harry Goring may refer to:

- Harry Goring (footballer) (1927–1994), English footballer
- Sir Harry Goring, 4th Baronet, English politician, MP for Steyning and Horsham
- Sir Harry Goring, 6th Baronet, British Member of Parliament for New Shoreham
- Sir Harry Goring, 8th Baronet, British Member of Parliament for New Shoreham

== See also ==
- Henry Goring (disambiguation)
