= Göring (surname) =

Göring, also spelled Goering, is a German surname (not to be confused with the English surname Goring). Notable people with this surname include the following:

- Hermann Göring (1893–1946), a leading member of the Nazi Party
  - Albert Göring (1895–1966), German businessman, brother of Hermann Göring
  - Carin Göring (1888–1931), Swedish first wife of Hermann Göring
  - Edda Göring (1938–2018), daughter of Hermann Göring
  - Emmy Göring (1893–1973), German actress and second wife of Hermann Göring
  - Heinrich Ernst Göring (1839–1913), German jurist, colonial governor of German South-West Africa, father of Hermann Göring
- Carl Göring (1841–1879), German master of chess and philosopher
- Franz Göring (born 1984), German cross country skier
- Kathrin Göring, German opera singer
- Matthias Göring (1879–1945), founder of the International General Medical Society for Psychotherapy

== See also ==
- Reinhard Goering (1887–1938), German playwright (see also Das Opfer (Zillig))
