= Werner Goering =

American bomber pilot (1924-2019)

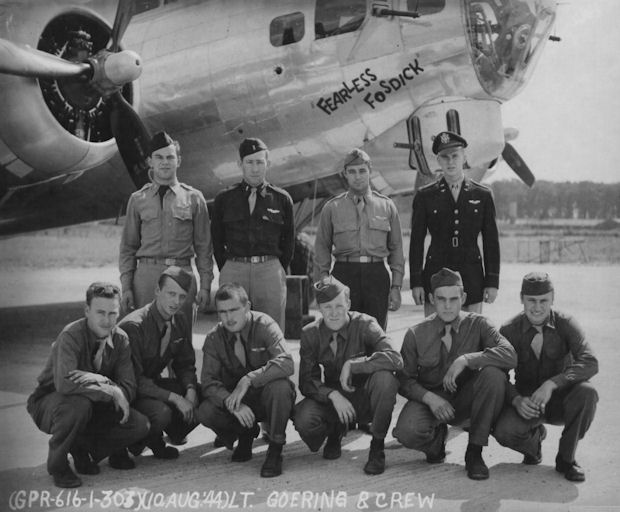
- Formal portrait of Werner Goering (top right) and his crew in front of the B-17 Fearless Fosdick
- Born: Werner Goering; March 11, 1924; Salt Lake City, Utah, U.S.
- Died: October 16, 2019 (aged 95); Tucson, Arizona, U.S.
- Military career
- Allegiance: United States of America
- Branch: United States Army Air Forces
- Service years: 1942–1964
- Rank: Lieutenant Colonel
- Nickname: Kraut
- Units: 358th Bombardment Squadron, 303rd Bomb Group (Heavy)
- Conflicts: World War II: Combined Bomber Offensive
- Awards: Distinguished Flying Cross

Werner George Goering (11 March 1924 – 16 October 2019) was an American bomber pilot who believed himself to be the nephew of the Luftwaffe leader Hermann Göring. During World War II he flew 48 missions over occupied Europe in Boeing B-17 Flying Fortress bombers.

== Early life ==
Werner G. Goering was born on 1 January 1924, the son of Karl Goering, a gardener employed by the Church of Jesus Christ of Latter-day Saints, and his wife Adele. He had an older brother, Karl Jr. The family spoke German at home. Although Karl claimed to be the brother of the World War I flying ace (who was later the second most important figure in the Nazi government and head of the Luftwaffe) Hermann Göring, genealogical research conducted in 2010 showed that they were not related.

Goering attended Horace Mann Junior High School and South High School in Salt Lake City, graduating near the bottom of his class. After the Japanese attack on Pearl Harbor brought the United States into World War II, he volunteered for service in the United States Army Air Forces. After passing the required tests, he was accepted for flight training at Santa Ana Army Air Base in California. He then qualified as a Boeing B-17 Flying Fortress pilot at Roswell Army Air Field in New Mexico. The claim that he was the nephew of Hermann Göring did not go unnoticed by the FBI.

== World War II ==
At Fort Douglas Army Airfield in Utah, Goering, now a first lieutenant, took charge of his B17 crew. Unbeknown to him, his co-pilot, Second Lieutenant Jack P. Rencher, had instructions from the FBI to shoot Goering if he attempted to crash land or bail out over Germany or German-occupied territory. Final training was completed at Dalhart Army Airfield in Texas, and MacDill Army Airfield in Florida. The crew traveled to England on the ocean liner RMS Aquitania, where they joined the 358th Bombardment Squadron, part of the 303d Bombardment Group, 41st Bombardment Wing, Eighth Air Force, based at RAF Molesworth. He acquired the nickname "Kraut". Goering flew a combat tour of 35 missions, then, at the end of 1944, volunteered for a second combat tour, and flew 14 more missions. He received the Distinguished Flying Cross.

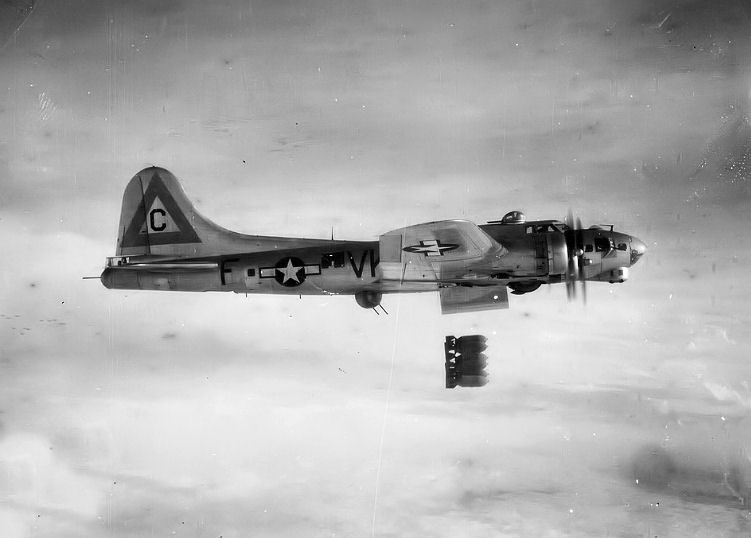
A 358th Bombardment Squadron B-17 on a bomb run

On 21 November 1944, Rencher came close to putting his orders into effect. A shell passed through the cockpit, narrowly missing Rencher, but still deafening him and giving him a concussion. Goering ordered his copilot to conduct an oxygen check, in which each crew member reported that their oxygen was okay. Without oxygen, a crewman would pass out and soon die. When Chester "Chad" Brodzinski, the radio operator, did not reply, Rencher ordered the turret gunner, Orall R. "Gus" Gustafson to check on him. Gustafson found that Brodzinski's oxygen hose had been severed. He administered oxygen from a portable bottle, and then repaired the hose. Goering managed to bring the B-17 home safely.

During a routine training flight on 7 December 1944 in the B-17 Mercy's Madhouse, the right landing gear collapsed, but Goering managed to steer the aircraft to a safe landing amid a shower of sparks and thick smoke. Another incident occurred when taking off for the bombing of Dresden on 15 February 1945. Taking off in dense fog, the unnamed B-17 he was flying got caught in prop wash from an adjacent runway, and pushed sideways. The plane crashed on takeoff, breaking into three parts. The bombardier suffered a broken arm and three other crewmen had minor injuries, but all managed to get clear before the plane exploded.

During a raid on Buer on 22 March 1945, Goering was flying another unnamed aircraft when it was hit by flak which knocked out an engine, the intercom, and the oxygen system, and started an electrical fire in the cockpit. Goering donned a portable oxygen mask and put out the fire with a fire extinguisher. He completed his bombing run. On another mission, a shell passed clean through the port wing without exploding, or setting off the fuel. Goering pumped the fuel into the right wing.

== Later life ==
Goering remained in the Army after the war ended, eventually transferring to the United States Air Force when it was formed in 1947. He married June Schott, one of his high school classmates, on 15 August 1946. They had two children, Carlinda and Scott. Due to his fluency in German, he was posted to Potsdam in the Soviet occupation zone of Germany, where he served as liaison offer to General Vasily Chuikov. He photographed a number of advanced aircraft, including the Ilyushin Il-28 bomber and the Mikoyan-Gurevich MiG-17 fighter.

During the 1950s, Goering flew the Boeing B-47 Stratojet bomber, a feared and difficult aircraft to fly, which caused the deaths of many airmen. He became intelligence officer of the 43d Bombardment Wing in 1956, and operations officer in 1959. In 1962, he was posted to Addis Ababa, in Ethiopia, as assistant Air Force attaché. Goering retired from the Air Force in 1964 with the rank of lieutenant colonel. He moved to Tucson, Arizona, where he became a realtor, subdividing ranches, and managed a 78,000-acre (32,000 ha) ranch. Goering died in Tucson, Arizona on October 16, 2019.
