= List of storms named Goring =

The name Goring has been used for fourteen tropical cyclones in the Philippine Area of Responsibility by PAGASA and its predecessor, the Philippine Weather Bureau, in the West Pacific Ocean:

- Severe Tropical Storm Carla (1965) (T6508, 10W, Goring) – a strong typhoon that was only considered by JMA as a severe tropical storm; brushed northern Philippines and Japan
- Severe Tropical Storm Winnie (1969) (T6906, 06W, Goring) – hit extreme northern Philippines
- Severe Tropical Storm Kate (1973) (T7312, 13W, Goring) – struck Hainan and northern Vietnam
- Typhoon Thelma (1977) (T7704, 06W, Goring) – struck the Philippines and Taiwan
- Tropical Depression Goring (1981) – short-lived tropical depression only recognized by PAGASA
- Typhoon Jeff (1985) (T8507, 07W, Goring) – struck China
- Typhoon Gordon (1989) (T8908, 08W, Goring) – a powerful typhoon which devastated the Philippines and China
- Typhoon Koryn (1993) (T9303, 06W, Goring) – struck the Philippines and China
- Typhoon Victor (1997) (T9712, 13W, Goring) – struck China
- Typhoon Wipha (2007) (T0712, 13W, Goring) – struck China
- Tropical Depression Goring (2011) – weak system that was only monitored by JMA and PAGASA
- Typhoon Halola (2015) (T1512, 01C, Goring) – developed in the Central Pacific Basin and made landfall over Kyushu
- Tropical Depression Goring (2019) – a tropical depression that was only tracked by JMA and PAGASA
- Typhoon Saola (2023) (T2309, 09W, Goring) – a Category 5 super typhoon that affected northern Philippines, Hong Kong, and Macau

The name Goring was retired following the 2023 Pacific typhoon season and was replaced with Gavino.
