= Henry Goring =

Henry Goring may refer to:

- Sir Henry Goring, 2nd Baronet (1622–1702), English barrister and politician, MP for Sussex and Steyning
- Henry Goring (1646–1685), MP for New Shoreham and Bramber and Steyning
- Sir Henry Goring, 4th Baronet (1679–1731), MP for Steyning and Horsham
- Sir Henry Goring, 2nd Baronet, 1st creation (c. 1618–1671), of the Goring baronets

== See also ==
- Harry Goring (disambiguation)
