= Trevor Goring =

English visual artist (born 1949)

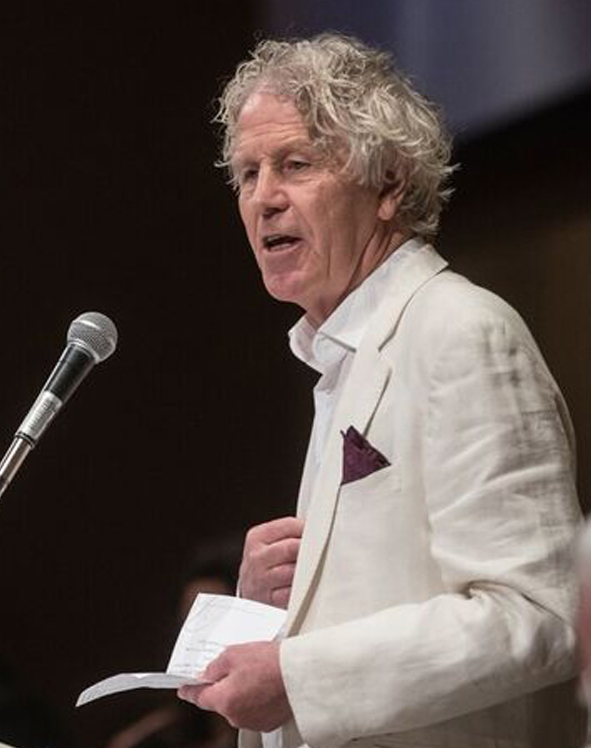
- Born: 1949 (age 76–77); London, England
- Known for: Visual art, author, publisher, lecturer and consultant
- Website: trevorgoring.com

Trevor Goring (born 1949, London, England) is a visual artist, author, publisher, lecturer and consultant.

== Early life and career ==
Trained in Montreal at the École des Beaux Arts, Université du Québec (1968–1972) in print-making with Pierre Ayot, and painting with Jacques Hurtubise and Fernand Leduc he completed scholarship post graduate studies at Saint Martin's College of Art, London, (1972–74) painting with Keith Grant and Frederick Gore, and sculpture with Anthony Caro. Returning to Canada he taught painting at the Montreal Museum School of Fine Arts and St. George's School, Westmount whilst exhibiting at Museums and galleries across Canada including the Montreal Museum of Fine Arts and the Musée d'art contemporain de Montréal. He was a participating artist in the 1976 Montreal Olympics art and architecture exhibition Corridart, curated by architect Melvin Charney.

Repeatedly elected chairman of Vehicle Art (1975–1982), Co-founder of The Association of National Non-Profit Artists' Centres (ANNPAC) and its magazine Parallelogramme he was active in lobbying for the rights of artists across Canada.

He co-founded, published and art directed Virus International, a contemporary arts magazine and Virus Montréal (1978–1984) the radical French language arts and entertainments magazine which gave voice to writers such as Jacques Lanctot, Rober Racine, Patrick Schupp and Richard Martineau.

Further seeking a connection between the arts and social justice Trevor Goring founded Images of Justice (1991), researching the visual history and symbolism of law from earliest times. Working closely with plaintiff litigators and criminal defence lawyers he has produced over 400 original paintings, hundreds of limited edition prints, two legal art history books, (Women In Law, preface by Margaret Sumerville and Judges In Time, preface by Hon. Colin D. McKinnon), and numerous magazine articles, video productions and public lectures, actively supporting and promoting the democratic values inherent in the civil and criminal justice system.

Trevor Goring's work with the North American and European trial lawyer community also includes frequent lectures on creative confidence and visual advocacy to organizations such as The American Association for Justice, The National College of Advocacy, American Inns of Court, The American Board of Trial Advocates, law schools and associations. He acts as a visual communications consultant on complex litigation cases, creating visual presentations for opening statements and closing arguments. He has served three consecutive terms on the Eastern Canada selection committee for Rhodes Scholarships.

In 2016 Trevor Goring founded the Trial Lawyer National Portrait Gallery TLNPG seeks to promote, through the medium of portraiture, an appreciation and understanding of those from history and those today who made or are making meaningful and important contributions to the criminal and civil justice system.
